

375001–375100 

|-bgcolor=#E9E9E9
| 375001 ||  || — || March 19, 2007 || Mount Lemmon || Mount Lemmon Survey || — || align=right | 1.2 km || 
|-id=002 bgcolor=#E9E9E9
| 375002 ||  || — || February 6, 2007 || Kitt Peak || Spacewatch || — || align=right | 2.2 km || 
|-id=003 bgcolor=#E9E9E9
| 375003 ||  || — || March 20, 2007 || Mount Lemmon || Mount Lemmon Survey || — || align=right | 2.0 km || 
|-id=004 bgcolor=#E9E9E9
| 375004 ||  || — || March 26, 2007 || Mount Lemmon || Mount Lemmon Survey || HNS || align=right | 1.2 km || 
|-id=005 bgcolor=#fefefe
| 375005 Newsome ||  ||  || March 26, 2007 || Calvin-Rehoboth || Calvin–Rehoboth Obs. || H || align=right data-sort-value="0.61" | 610 m || 
|-id=006 bgcolor=#E9E9E9
| 375006 || 2007 GU || — || April 7, 2007 || Mount Lemmon || Mount Lemmon Survey || — || align=right | 2.9 km || 
|-id=007 bgcolor=#E9E9E9
| 375007 Buxy ||  ||  || April 14, 2007 || Nogales || J.-C. Merlin || — || align=right | 2.4 km || 
|-id=008 bgcolor=#E9E9E9
| 375008 ||  || — || April 8, 2007 || Purple Mountain || PMO NEO || AER || align=right | 2.0 km || 
|-id=009 bgcolor=#E9E9E9
| 375009 ||  || — || April 11, 2007 || Mount Lemmon || Mount Lemmon Survey || — || align=right | 2.0 km || 
|-id=010 bgcolor=#E9E9E9
| 375010 ||  || — || April 11, 2007 || Kitt Peak || Spacewatch || — || align=right | 3.6 km || 
|-id=011 bgcolor=#E9E9E9
| 375011 ||  || — || April 11, 2007 || Mount Lemmon || Mount Lemmon Survey || HOF || align=right | 2.8 km || 
|-id=012 bgcolor=#E9E9E9
| 375012 ||  || — || April 11, 2007 || Mount Lemmon || Mount Lemmon Survey || AST || align=right | 1.7 km || 
|-id=013 bgcolor=#E9E9E9
| 375013 ||  || — || April 11, 2007 || Mount Lemmon || Mount Lemmon Survey || AER || align=right | 2.1 km || 
|-id=014 bgcolor=#E9E9E9
| 375014 ||  || — || April 15, 2007 || Kitt Peak || Spacewatch || — || align=right | 1.8 km || 
|-id=015 bgcolor=#E9E9E9
| 375015 ||  || — || April 13, 2007 || Siding Spring || SSS || — || align=right | 1.6 km || 
|-id=016 bgcolor=#E9E9E9
| 375016 ||  || — || April 14, 2007 || Kitt Peak || Spacewatch || — || align=right | 2.4 km || 
|-id=017 bgcolor=#E9E9E9
| 375017 ||  || — || April 14, 2007 || Kitt Peak || Spacewatch || WIT || align=right data-sort-value="0.92" | 920 m || 
|-id=018 bgcolor=#E9E9E9
| 375018 ||  || — || April 14, 2007 || Kitt Peak || Spacewatch || — || align=right | 3.3 km || 
|-id=019 bgcolor=#E9E9E9
| 375019 ||  || — || April 14, 2007 || Kitt Peak || Spacewatch || — || align=right | 2.7 km || 
|-id=020 bgcolor=#E9E9E9
| 375020 ||  || — || April 15, 2007 || Kitt Peak || Spacewatch || BRU || align=right | 2.2 km || 
|-id=021 bgcolor=#E9E9E9
| 375021 ||  || — || January 9, 2006 || Mount Lemmon || Mount Lemmon Survey || — || align=right | 2.2 km || 
|-id=022 bgcolor=#E9E9E9
| 375022 ||  || — || April 15, 2007 || Kitt Peak || Spacewatch || — || align=right | 1.5 km || 
|-id=023 bgcolor=#E9E9E9
| 375023 ||  || — || April 15, 2007 || Kitt Peak || Spacewatch || AGN || align=right | 1.2 km || 
|-id=024 bgcolor=#E9E9E9
| 375024 ||  || — || April 15, 2007 || Kitt Peak || Spacewatch || — || align=right | 2.5 km || 
|-id=025 bgcolor=#fefefe
| 375025 ||  || — || April 15, 2007 || Catalina || CSS || H || align=right data-sort-value="0.80" | 800 m || 
|-id=026 bgcolor=#E9E9E9
| 375026 ||  || — || April 14, 2007 || Mount Lemmon || Mount Lemmon Survey || — || align=right | 3.4 km || 
|-id=027 bgcolor=#E9E9E9
| 375027 ||  || — || April 15, 2007 || Kitt Peak || Spacewatch || — || align=right | 2.2 km || 
|-id=028 bgcolor=#E9E9E9
| 375028 ||  || — || April 11, 2007 || Kitt Peak || Spacewatch || — || align=right | 2.7 km || 
|-id=029 bgcolor=#E9E9E9
| 375029 ||  || — || March 20, 2007 || Mount Lemmon || Mount Lemmon Survey || WIT || align=right data-sort-value="0.88" | 880 m || 
|-id=030 bgcolor=#E9E9E9
| 375030 ||  || — || April 19, 2007 || Mount Lemmon || Mount Lemmon Survey || — || align=right | 1.6 km || 
|-id=031 bgcolor=#E9E9E9
| 375031 ||  || — || April 16, 2007 || Anderson Mesa || LONEOS || NEM || align=right | 3.5 km || 
|-id=032 bgcolor=#E9E9E9
| 375032 ||  || — || April 16, 2007 || Catalina || CSS || — || align=right | 3.0 km || 
|-id=033 bgcolor=#E9E9E9
| 375033 ||  || — || April 16, 2007 || Catalina || CSS || — || align=right | 2.4 km || 
|-id=034 bgcolor=#E9E9E9
| 375034 ||  || — || April 20, 2007 || Mount Lemmon || Mount Lemmon Survey || — || align=right | 2.4 km || 
|-id=035 bgcolor=#E9E9E9
| 375035 ||  || — || April 20, 2007 || Socorro || LINEAR || — || align=right | 1.4 km || 
|-id=036 bgcolor=#E9E9E9
| 375036 ||  || — || April 22, 2007 || Kitt Peak || Spacewatch || HOF || align=right | 3.1 km || 
|-id=037 bgcolor=#E9E9E9
| 375037 ||  || — || April 22, 2007 || Mount Lemmon || Mount Lemmon Survey || WIT || align=right | 1.2 km || 
|-id=038 bgcolor=#E9E9E9
| 375038 ||  || — || April 22, 2007 || Kitt Peak || Spacewatch || — || align=right | 2.8 km || 
|-id=039 bgcolor=#E9E9E9
| 375039 ||  || — || April 22, 2007 || Kitt Peak || Spacewatch || — || align=right | 2.3 km || 
|-id=040 bgcolor=#E9E9E9
| 375040 ||  || — || April 23, 2007 || Kitt Peak || Spacewatch || — || align=right | 1.6 km || 
|-id=041 bgcolor=#E9E9E9
| 375041 ||  || — || April 24, 2007 || Kitt Peak || Spacewatch || — || align=right | 2.6 km || 
|-id=042 bgcolor=#fefefe
| 375042 ||  || — || May 8, 2007 || Anderson Mesa || LONEOS || H || align=right data-sort-value="0.72" | 720 m || 
|-id=043 bgcolor=#E9E9E9
| 375043 Zengweizhou ||  ||  || May 11, 2007 || Lulin Observatory || Q.-z. Ye, H.-C. Lin || — || align=right | 2.7 km || 
|-id=044 bgcolor=#E9E9E9
| 375044 ||  || — || May 9, 2007 || Mount Lemmon || Mount Lemmon Survey || — || align=right | 2.1 km || 
|-id=045 bgcolor=#E9E9E9
| 375045 ||  || — || May 10, 2007 || Kitt Peak || Spacewatch || — || align=right | 2.7 km || 
|-id=046 bgcolor=#E9E9E9
| 375046 ||  || — || May 12, 2007 || Mount Lemmon || Mount Lemmon Survey || EUN || align=right | 1.2 km || 
|-id=047 bgcolor=#fefefe
| 375047 ||  || — || May 12, 2007 || Kitt Peak || Spacewatch || H || align=right data-sort-value="0.80" | 800 m || 
|-id=048 bgcolor=#d6d6d6
| 375048 ||  || — || June 9, 2007 || Kitt Peak || Spacewatch || — || align=right | 2.5 km || 
|-id=049 bgcolor=#E9E9E9
| 375049 ||  || — || June 9, 2007 || Kitt Peak || Spacewatch || AGN || align=right | 1.2 km || 
|-id=050 bgcolor=#d6d6d6
| 375050 ||  || — || June 13, 2007 || Kitt Peak || Spacewatch || BRA || align=right | 2.1 km || 
|-id=051 bgcolor=#d6d6d6
| 375051 ||  || — || June 14, 2007 || Kitt Peak || Spacewatch || — || align=right | 3.3 km || 
|-id=052 bgcolor=#E9E9E9
| 375052 ||  || — || June 15, 2007 || Kitt Peak || Spacewatch || — || align=right | 2.3 km || 
|-id=053 bgcolor=#d6d6d6
| 375053 ||  || — || July 13, 2007 || Reedy Creek || J. Broughton || — || align=right | 3.0 km || 
|-id=054 bgcolor=#FFC2E0
| 375054 ||  || — || August 8, 2007 || Socorro || LINEAR || APOPHAcritical || align=right data-sort-value="0.26" | 260 m || 
|-id=055 bgcolor=#d6d6d6
| 375055 ||  || — || August 8, 2007 || Socorro || LINEAR || — || align=right | 3.3 km || 
|-id=056 bgcolor=#d6d6d6
| 375056 ||  || — || August 7, 2007 || Palomar || Palomar Obs. || HYG || align=right | 2.7 km || 
|-id=057 bgcolor=#d6d6d6
| 375057 ||  || — || August 8, 2007 || Socorro || LINEAR || — || align=right | 3.5 km || 
|-id=058 bgcolor=#E9E9E9
| 375058 ||  || — || August 11, 2007 || Anderson Mesa || LONEOS || — || align=right | 3.4 km || 
|-id=059 bgcolor=#d6d6d6
| 375059 ||  || — || February 16, 1999 || Caussols || ODAS || — || align=right | 4.1 km || 
|-id=060 bgcolor=#d6d6d6
| 375060 ||  || — || August 10, 2007 || Kitt Peak || Spacewatch || — || align=right | 5.3 km || 
|-id=061 bgcolor=#d6d6d6
| 375061 ||  || — || August 10, 2007 || Kitt Peak || Spacewatch || — || align=right | 3.2 km || 
|-id=062 bgcolor=#d6d6d6
| 375062 ||  || — || August 10, 2007 || Kitt Peak || Spacewatch || 7:4 || align=right | 3.1 km || 
|-id=063 bgcolor=#d6d6d6
| 375063 ||  || — || August 10, 2007 || Kitt Peak || Spacewatch || VER || align=right | 2.9 km || 
|-id=064 bgcolor=#d6d6d6
| 375064 || 2007 QH || — || August 16, 2007 || Bisei SG Center || BATTeRS || — || align=right | 4.5 km || 
|-id=065 bgcolor=#d6d6d6
| 375065 ||  || — || August 23, 2007 || Kitt Peak || Spacewatch || — || align=right | 3.7 km || 
|-id=066 bgcolor=#d6d6d6
| 375066 ||  || — || August 31, 2007 || Siding Spring || K. Sárneczky, L. Kiss || — || align=right | 2.4 km || 
|-id=067 bgcolor=#d6d6d6
| 375067 Hewins ||  ||  || September 6, 2007 || Vicques || M. Ory || HYG || align=right | 3.4 km || 
|-id=068 bgcolor=#d6d6d6
| 375068 ||  || — || September 11, 2007 || Dauban || Chante-Perdrix Obs. || — || align=right | 4.4 km || 
|-id=069 bgcolor=#d6d6d6
| 375069 ||  || — || September 12, 2007 || Hibiscus || N. Teamo, J.-C. Pelle || — || align=right | 3.1 km || 
|-id=070 bgcolor=#d6d6d6
| 375070 ||  || — || September 5, 2007 || Catalina || CSS || LIX || align=right | 4.5 km || 
|-id=071 bgcolor=#d6d6d6
| 375071 ||  || — || September 9, 2007 || Kitt Peak || Spacewatch || THM || align=right | 2.9 km || 
|-id=072 bgcolor=#d6d6d6
| 375072 ||  || — || September 9, 2007 || Kitt Peak || Spacewatch || — || align=right | 3.0 km || 
|-id=073 bgcolor=#d6d6d6
| 375073 ||  || — || September 9, 2007 || Mount Lemmon || Mount Lemmon Survey || — || align=right | 2.7 km || 
|-id=074 bgcolor=#d6d6d6
| 375074 ||  || — || September 10, 2007 || Kitt Peak || Spacewatch || — || align=right | 4.4 km || 
|-id=075 bgcolor=#d6d6d6
| 375075 ||  || — || September 10, 2007 || Mount Lemmon || Mount Lemmon Survey || — || align=right | 3.5 km || 
|-id=076 bgcolor=#d6d6d6
| 375076 ||  || — || September 10, 2007 || Catalina || CSS || — || align=right | 4.1 km || 
|-id=077 bgcolor=#d6d6d6
| 375077 ||  || — || September 10, 2007 || Catalina || CSS || EUP || align=right | 3.9 km || 
|-id=078 bgcolor=#d6d6d6
| 375078 ||  || — || September 10, 2007 || Mount Lemmon || Mount Lemmon Survey || EOS || align=right | 2.3 km || 
|-id=079 bgcolor=#d6d6d6
| 375079 ||  || — || September 10, 2007 || Kitt Peak || Spacewatch || — || align=right | 4.0 km || 
|-id=080 bgcolor=#d6d6d6
| 375080 ||  || — || September 10, 2007 || Mount Lemmon || Mount Lemmon Survey || — || align=right | 3.7 km || 
|-id=081 bgcolor=#d6d6d6
| 375081 ||  || — || September 10, 2007 || Mount Lemmon || Mount Lemmon Survey || — || align=right | 4.2 km || 
|-id=082 bgcolor=#d6d6d6
| 375082 ||  || — || September 11, 2007 || Kitt Peak || Spacewatch || — || align=right | 4.2 km || 
|-id=083 bgcolor=#d6d6d6
| 375083 ||  || — || September 13, 2007 || Kitt Peak || Spacewatch || — || align=right | 2.8 km || 
|-id=084 bgcolor=#d6d6d6
| 375084 ||  || — || September 10, 2007 || Kitt Peak || Spacewatch || — || align=right | 4.1 km || 
|-id=085 bgcolor=#fefefe
| 375085 ||  || — || September 10, 2007 || Kitt Peak || Spacewatch || MAS || align=right data-sort-value="0.60" | 600 m || 
|-id=086 bgcolor=#d6d6d6
| 375086 ||  || — || September 11, 2007 || Kitt Peak || Spacewatch || THM || align=right | 2.2 km || 
|-id=087 bgcolor=#d6d6d6
| 375087 ||  || — || September 10, 2007 || Kitt Peak || Spacewatch || — || align=right | 3.7 km || 
|-id=088 bgcolor=#d6d6d6
| 375088 ||  || — || September 12, 2007 || Catalina || CSS || — || align=right | 4.4 km || 
|-id=089 bgcolor=#d6d6d6
| 375089 ||  || — || September 14, 2007 || Mount Lemmon || Mount Lemmon Survey || THM || align=right | 2.5 km || 
|-id=090 bgcolor=#d6d6d6
| 375090 ||  || — || September 15, 2007 || Socorro || LINEAR || — || align=right | 4.3 km || 
|-id=091 bgcolor=#d6d6d6
| 375091 ||  || — || September 12, 2007 || Mount Lemmon || Mount Lemmon Survey || THM || align=right | 2.5 km || 
|-id=092 bgcolor=#d6d6d6
| 375092 ||  || — || September 8, 2007 || Anderson Mesa || LONEOS || — || align=right | 4.0 km || 
|-id=093 bgcolor=#d6d6d6
| 375093 ||  || — || September 4, 2007 || Catalina || CSS || — || align=right | 4.3 km || 
|-id=094 bgcolor=#d6d6d6
| 375094 ||  || — || September 4, 2007 || Catalina || CSS || TIR || align=right | 3.2 km || 
|-id=095 bgcolor=#fefefe
| 375095 ||  || — || September 10, 2007 || Mount Lemmon || Mount Lemmon Survey || MAS || align=right data-sort-value="0.57" | 570 m || 
|-id=096 bgcolor=#d6d6d6
| 375096 ||  || — || September 13, 2007 || Mount Lemmon || Mount Lemmon Survey || HYG || align=right | 3.1 km || 
|-id=097 bgcolor=#d6d6d6
| 375097 ||  || — || September 9, 2007 || Kitt Peak || Spacewatch || EOS || align=right | 2.8 km || 
|-id=098 bgcolor=#d6d6d6
| 375098 ||  || — || September 19, 2007 || Kitt Peak || Spacewatch || HYG || align=right | 3.0 km || 
|-id=099 bgcolor=#d6d6d6
| 375099 ||  || — || October 2, 2007 || Siding Spring || SSS || — || align=right | 3.0 km || 
|-id=100 bgcolor=#d6d6d6
| 375100 ||  || — || October 6, 2007 || Socorro || LINEAR || — || align=right | 3.6 km || 
|}

375101–375200 

|-bgcolor=#d6d6d6
| 375101 ||  || — || October 7, 2007 || Kitt Peak || Spacewatch || 7:4 || align=right | 4.1 km || 
|-id=102 bgcolor=#fefefe
| 375102 ||  || — || October 4, 2007 || Kitt Peak || Spacewatch || — || align=right data-sort-value="0.54" | 540 m || 
|-id=103 bgcolor=#FFC2E0
| 375103 ||  || — || October 13, 2007 || Siding Spring || SSS || APOPHA || align=right data-sort-value="0.74" | 740 m || 
|-id=104 bgcolor=#d6d6d6
| 375104 ||  || — || October 4, 2007 || Catalina || CSS || — || align=right | 4.6 km || 
|-id=105 bgcolor=#d6d6d6
| 375105 ||  || — || October 6, 2007 || 7300 Observatory || W. K. Y. Yeung || 7:4 || align=right | 2.7 km || 
|-id=106 bgcolor=#d6d6d6
| 375106 ||  || — || October 6, 2007 || Kitt Peak || Spacewatch || SYL7:4 || align=right | 4.2 km || 
|-id=107 bgcolor=#d6d6d6
| 375107 ||  || — || June 6, 2005 || Kitt Peak || Spacewatch || — || align=right | 4.5 km || 
|-id=108 bgcolor=#d6d6d6
| 375108 ||  || — || October 6, 2007 || Socorro || LINEAR || — || align=right | 3.1 km || 
|-id=109 bgcolor=#d6d6d6
| 375109 ||  || — || October 12, 2007 || Dauban || Chante-Perdrix Obs. || VER || align=right | 3.3 km || 
|-id=110 bgcolor=#d6d6d6
| 375110 ||  || — || October 8, 2007 || Mount Lemmon || Mount Lemmon Survey || THM || align=right | 2.9 km || 
|-id=111 bgcolor=#d6d6d6
| 375111 ||  || — || September 12, 2007 || Kitt Peak || Spacewatch || — || align=right | 3.0 km || 
|-id=112 bgcolor=#d6d6d6
| 375112 ||  || — || September 6, 2007 || Anderson Mesa || LONEOS || EUP || align=right | 3.3 km || 
|-id=113 bgcolor=#d6d6d6
| 375113 ||  || — || September 11, 2007 || Črni Vrh || Črni Vrh || LIX || align=right | 4.2 km || 
|-id=114 bgcolor=#d6d6d6
| 375114 ||  || — || November 4, 1996 || Kitt Peak || Spacewatch || — || align=right | 2.7 km || 
|-id=115 bgcolor=#d6d6d6
| 375115 ||  || — || October 10, 2007 || Mount Lemmon || Mount Lemmon Survey || — || align=right | 3.5 km || 
|-id=116 bgcolor=#d6d6d6
| 375116 ||  || — || October 9, 2007 || Mount Lemmon || Mount Lemmon Survey || URS || align=right | 3.4 km || 
|-id=117 bgcolor=#d6d6d6
| 375117 ||  || — || October 9, 2007 || Mount Lemmon || Mount Lemmon Survey || URS || align=right | 3.5 km || 
|-id=118 bgcolor=#d6d6d6
| 375118 ||  || — || October 15, 2007 || Catalina || CSS || — || align=right | 3.7 km || 
|-id=119 bgcolor=#d6d6d6
| 375119 ||  || — || October 8, 2007 || Catalina || CSS || — || align=right | 3.4 km || 
|-id=120 bgcolor=#d6d6d6
| 375120 ||  || — || October 10, 2007 || Catalina || CSS || — || align=right | 4.1 km || 
|-id=121 bgcolor=#d6d6d6
| 375121 ||  || — || October 14, 2007 || Catalina || CSS || LUT || align=right | 6.1 km || 
|-id=122 bgcolor=#fefefe
| 375122 ||  || — || October 16, 2007 || Kitt Peak || Spacewatch || — || align=right data-sort-value="0.82" | 820 m || 
|-id=123 bgcolor=#d6d6d6
| 375123 ||  || — || October 30, 2007 || Kitt Peak || Spacewatch || LIX || align=right | 4.2 km || 
|-id=124 bgcolor=#d6d6d6
| 375124 ||  || — || October 30, 2007 || Mount Lemmon || Mount Lemmon Survey || THM || align=right | 2.3 km || 
|-id=125 bgcolor=#d6d6d6
| 375125 ||  || — || November 1, 2007 || Mount Lemmon || Mount Lemmon Survey || — || align=right | 4.0 km || 
|-id=126 bgcolor=#fefefe
| 375126 ||  || — || November 11, 2007 || Bisei SG Center || BATTeRS || — || align=right data-sort-value="0.59" | 590 m || 
|-id=127 bgcolor=#fefefe
| 375127 ||  || — || November 11, 2007 || Bisei SG Center || BATTeRS || MAS || align=right data-sort-value="0.71" | 710 m || 
|-id=128 bgcolor=#fefefe
| 375128 ||  || — || May 7, 2006 || Mount Lemmon || Mount Lemmon Survey || FLO || align=right data-sort-value="0.65" | 650 m || 
|-id=129 bgcolor=#FA8072
| 375129 ||  || — || November 15, 2007 || Mount Lemmon || Mount Lemmon Survey || — || align=right data-sort-value="0.63" | 630 m || 
|-id=130 bgcolor=#fefefe
| 375130 ||  || — || November 2, 2007 || Kitt Peak || Spacewatch || — || align=right data-sort-value="0.78" | 780 m || 
|-id=131 bgcolor=#d6d6d6
| 375131 ||  || — || November 14, 2007 || Anderson Mesa || LONEOS || — || align=right | 4.3 km || 
|-id=132 bgcolor=#d6d6d6
| 375132 ||  || — || November 17, 2007 || Catalina || CSS || 7:4 || align=right | 5.6 km || 
|-id=133 bgcolor=#d6d6d6
| 375133 ||  || — || November 4, 2007 || Kitt Peak || Spacewatch || SYL7:4 || align=right | 4.9 km || 
|-id=134 bgcolor=#fefefe
| 375134 ||  || — || November 20, 2007 || Mount Lemmon || Mount Lemmon Survey || — || align=right data-sort-value="0.86" | 860 m || 
|-id=135 bgcolor=#fefefe
| 375135 ||  || — || December 31, 2007 || Mount Lemmon || Mount Lemmon Survey || — || align=right data-sort-value="0.71" | 710 m || 
|-id=136 bgcolor=#fefefe
| 375136 ||  || — || December 30, 2007 || Kitt Peak || Spacewatch || — || align=right data-sort-value="0.65" | 650 m || 
|-id=137 bgcolor=#fefefe
| 375137 ||  || — || December 31, 2007 || Kitt Peak || Spacewatch || — || align=right data-sort-value="0.93" | 930 m || 
|-id=138 bgcolor=#E9E9E9
| 375138 ||  || — || January 10, 2008 || Mount Lemmon || Mount Lemmon Survey || — || align=right | 1.3 km || 
|-id=139 bgcolor=#fefefe
| 375139 ||  || — || December 19, 2007 || Mount Lemmon || Mount Lemmon Survey || — || align=right data-sort-value="0.83" | 830 m || 
|-id=140 bgcolor=#fefefe
| 375140 ||  || — || January 10, 2008 || Kitt Peak || Spacewatch || — || align=right data-sort-value="0.55" | 550 m || 
|-id=141 bgcolor=#fefefe
| 375141 ||  || — || January 12, 2008 || Kitt Peak || Spacewatch || — || align=right data-sort-value="0.84" | 840 m || 
|-id=142 bgcolor=#fefefe
| 375142 ||  || — || January 12, 2008 || Kitt Peak || Spacewatch || — || align=right data-sort-value="0.66" | 660 m || 
|-id=143 bgcolor=#fefefe
| 375143 ||  || — || January 10, 2008 || Mount Lemmon || Mount Lemmon Survey || — || align=right data-sort-value="0.97" | 970 m || 
|-id=144 bgcolor=#fefefe
| 375144 ||  || — || January 3, 2008 || XuYi || PMO NEO || — || align=right data-sort-value="0.87" | 870 m || 
|-id=145 bgcolor=#fefefe
| 375145 ||  || — || January 15, 2008 || Kitt Peak || Spacewatch || — || align=right data-sort-value="0.79" | 790 m || 
|-id=146 bgcolor=#fefefe
| 375146 ||  || — || November 11, 2007 || Mount Lemmon || Mount Lemmon Survey || — || align=right data-sort-value="0.57" | 570 m || 
|-id=147 bgcolor=#fefefe
| 375147 ||  || — || January 31, 2008 || Mount Lemmon || Mount Lemmon Survey || — || align=right data-sort-value="0.95" | 950 m || 
|-id=148 bgcolor=#fefefe
| 375148 ||  || — || January 30, 2008 || Mount Lemmon || Mount Lemmon Survey || FLO || align=right data-sort-value="0.62" | 620 m || 
|-id=149 bgcolor=#fefefe
| 375149 ||  || — || January 30, 2008 || Eskridge || G. Hug || — || align=right data-sort-value="0.59" | 590 m || 
|-id=150 bgcolor=#fefefe
| 375150 ||  || — || February 3, 2008 || Kitt Peak || Spacewatch || FLO || align=right data-sort-value="0.68" | 680 m || 
|-id=151 bgcolor=#E9E9E9
| 375151 ||  || — || February 1, 2008 || Kitt Peak || Spacewatch || — || align=right | 1.2 km || 
|-id=152 bgcolor=#fefefe
| 375152 ||  || — || February 2, 2008 || Kitt Peak || Spacewatch || — || align=right data-sort-value="0.86" | 860 m || 
|-id=153 bgcolor=#fefefe
| 375153 ||  || — || February 2, 2008 || Mount Lemmon || Mount Lemmon Survey || NYS || align=right data-sort-value="0.65" | 650 m || 
|-id=154 bgcolor=#fefefe
| 375154 ||  || — || February 2, 2008 || Kitt Peak || Spacewatch || — || align=right data-sort-value="0.93" | 930 m || 
|-id=155 bgcolor=#fefefe
| 375155 ||  || — || February 7, 2008 || Mount Lemmon || Mount Lemmon Survey || — || align=right data-sort-value="0.69" | 690 m || 
|-id=156 bgcolor=#fefefe
| 375156 ||  || — || February 11, 2008 || Taunus || E. Schwab, R. Kling || V || align=right data-sort-value="0.57" | 570 m || 
|-id=157 bgcolor=#fefefe
| 375157 ||  || — || February 8, 2008 || Kitt Peak || Spacewatch || FLO || align=right data-sort-value="0.68" | 680 m || 
|-id=158 bgcolor=#fefefe
| 375158 ||  || — || February 1, 2008 || Kitt Peak || Spacewatch || NYS || align=right data-sort-value="0.72" | 720 m || 
|-id=159 bgcolor=#fefefe
| 375159 ||  || — || February 8, 2008 || Catalina || CSS || FLO || align=right data-sort-value="0.74" | 740 m || 
|-id=160 bgcolor=#fefefe
| 375160 ||  || — || February 8, 2008 || Kitt Peak || Spacewatch || — || align=right data-sort-value="0.65" | 650 m || 
|-id=161 bgcolor=#fefefe
| 375161 ||  || — || February 9, 2008 || Kitt Peak || Spacewatch || — || align=right data-sort-value="0.77" | 770 m || 
|-id=162 bgcolor=#fefefe
| 375162 ||  || — || February 9, 2008 || Kitt Peak || Spacewatch || — || align=right data-sort-value="0.75" | 750 m || 
|-id=163 bgcolor=#fefefe
| 375163 ||  || — || February 10, 2008 || Kitt Peak || Spacewatch || MAS || align=right data-sort-value="0.78" | 780 m || 
|-id=164 bgcolor=#fefefe
| 375164 ||  || — || February 6, 2008 || Catalina || CSS || — || align=right | 1.1 km || 
|-id=165 bgcolor=#fefefe
| 375165 ||  || — || February 6, 2008 || Catalina || CSS || — || align=right | 1.3 km || 
|-id=166 bgcolor=#fefefe
| 375166 ||  || — || February 13, 2008 || Mount Lemmon || Mount Lemmon Survey || — || align=right data-sort-value="0.83" | 830 m || 
|-id=167 bgcolor=#fefefe
| 375167 ||  || — || February 8, 2008 || Kitt Peak || Spacewatch || MAS || align=right data-sort-value="0.78" | 780 m || 
|-id=168 bgcolor=#fefefe
| 375168 ||  || — || February 8, 2008 || Kitt Peak || Spacewatch || MAS || align=right data-sort-value="0.68" | 680 m || 
|-id=169 bgcolor=#fefefe
| 375169 ||  || — || November 18, 2007 || Mount Lemmon || Mount Lemmon Survey || V || align=right data-sort-value="0.82" | 820 m || 
|-id=170 bgcolor=#fefefe
| 375170 ||  || — || February 12, 2008 || Mount Lemmon || Mount Lemmon Survey || FLO || align=right data-sort-value="0.67" | 670 m || 
|-id=171 bgcolor=#fefefe
| 375171 ||  || — || February 13, 2008 || Socorro || LINEAR || — || align=right data-sort-value="0.96" | 960 m || 
|-id=172 bgcolor=#fefefe
| 375172 ||  || — || February 13, 2008 || Mount Lemmon || Mount Lemmon Survey || — || align=right | 1.0 km || 
|-id=173 bgcolor=#fefefe
| 375173 ||  || — || December 5, 2007 || Mount Lemmon || Mount Lemmon Survey || NYS || align=right data-sort-value="0.75" | 750 m || 
|-id=174 bgcolor=#fefefe
| 375174 ||  || — || January 15, 2008 || Mount Lemmon || Mount Lemmon Survey || — || align=right | 1.1 km || 
|-id=175 bgcolor=#fefefe
| 375175 ||  || — || October 28, 2006 || Mount Lemmon || Mount Lemmon Survey || MAS || align=right data-sort-value="0.83" | 830 m || 
|-id=176 bgcolor=#fefefe
| 375176 Béziau ||  ||  || February 28, 2008 || Nogales || J.-C. Merlin || — || align=right data-sort-value="0.86" | 860 m || 
|-id=177 bgcolor=#fefefe
| 375177 ||  || — || February 24, 2008 || Kitt Peak || Spacewatch || MAS || align=right data-sort-value="0.73" | 730 m || 
|-id=178 bgcolor=#fefefe
| 375178 ||  || — || April 1, 2005 || Bergisch Gladbach || W. Bickel || — || align=right data-sort-value="0.72" | 720 m || 
|-id=179 bgcolor=#d6d6d6
| 375179 ||  || — || February 27, 2008 || Mount Lemmon || Mount Lemmon Survey || 3:2 || align=right | 4.2 km || 
|-id=180 bgcolor=#fefefe
| 375180 ||  || — || February 27, 2008 || Kitt Peak || Spacewatch || — || align=right data-sort-value="0.93" | 930 m || 
|-id=181 bgcolor=#fefefe
| 375181 ||  || — || February 29, 2008 || Mount Lemmon || Mount Lemmon Survey || — || align=right data-sort-value="0.67" | 670 m || 
|-id=182 bgcolor=#fefefe
| 375182 ||  || — || February 27, 2008 || Kitt Peak || Spacewatch || — || align=right | 1.0 km || 
|-id=183 bgcolor=#fefefe
| 375183 ||  || — || February 28, 2008 || Mount Lemmon || Mount Lemmon Survey || — || align=right data-sort-value="0.69" | 690 m || 
|-id=184 bgcolor=#fefefe
| 375184 ||  || — || February 27, 2008 || Mount Lemmon || Mount Lemmon Survey || NYS || align=right data-sort-value="0.63" | 630 m || 
|-id=185 bgcolor=#fefefe
| 375185 ||  || — || February 7, 2008 || Kitt Peak || Spacewatch || V || align=right data-sort-value="0.76" | 760 m || 
|-id=186 bgcolor=#fefefe
| 375186 ||  || — || February 28, 2008 || Mount Lemmon || Mount Lemmon Survey || — || align=right data-sort-value="0.63" | 630 m || 
|-id=187 bgcolor=#fefefe
| 375187 ||  || — || February 28, 2008 || Kitt Peak || Spacewatch || — || align=right data-sort-value="0.89" | 890 m || 
|-id=188 bgcolor=#fefefe
| 375188 ||  || — || February 28, 2008 || Kitt Peak || Spacewatch || — || align=right data-sort-value="0.65" | 650 m || 
|-id=189 bgcolor=#fefefe
| 375189 ||  || — || February 28, 2008 || Kitt Peak || Spacewatch || — || align=right data-sort-value="0.66" | 660 m || 
|-id=190 bgcolor=#fefefe
| 375190 ||  || — || February 26, 2008 || Kitt Peak || Spacewatch || — || align=right data-sort-value="0.96" | 960 m || 
|-id=191 bgcolor=#fefefe
| 375191 ||  || — || March 3, 2008 || Dauban || F. Kugel || ERI || align=right | 1.9 km || 
|-id=192 bgcolor=#fefefe
| 375192 ||  || — || March 1, 2008 || Kitt Peak || Spacewatch || — || align=right data-sort-value="0.93" | 930 m || 
|-id=193 bgcolor=#fefefe
| 375193 ||  || — || March 3, 2008 || Catalina || CSS || — || align=right data-sort-value="0.79" | 790 m || 
|-id=194 bgcolor=#fefefe
| 375194 ||  || — || March 4, 2008 || Mount Lemmon || Mount Lemmon Survey || — || align=right data-sort-value="0.83" | 830 m || 
|-id=195 bgcolor=#fefefe
| 375195 ||  || — || March 6, 2008 || Jarnac || Jarnac Obs. || — || align=right data-sort-value="0.84" | 840 m || 
|-id=196 bgcolor=#fefefe
| 375196 ||  || — || March 1, 2008 || Kitt Peak || Spacewatch || — || align=right data-sort-value="0.70" | 700 m || 
|-id=197 bgcolor=#fefefe
| 375197 ||  || — || March 1, 2008 || Kitt Peak || Spacewatch || V || align=right data-sort-value="0.94" | 940 m || 
|-id=198 bgcolor=#fefefe
| 375198 ||  || — || March 4, 2008 || Kitt Peak || Spacewatch || FLO || align=right data-sort-value="0.70" | 700 m || 
|-id=199 bgcolor=#fefefe
| 375199 ||  || — || March 4, 2008 || Kitt Peak || Spacewatch || PHO || align=right | 1.2 km || 
|-id=200 bgcolor=#fefefe
| 375200 ||  || — || January 15, 2008 || Mount Lemmon || Mount Lemmon Survey || — || align=right data-sort-value="0.72" | 720 m || 
|}

375201–375300 

|-bgcolor=#fefefe
| 375201 ||  || — || March 7, 2008 || Kitt Peak || Spacewatch || — || align=right data-sort-value="0.78" | 780 m || 
|-id=202 bgcolor=#fefefe
| 375202 ||  || — || March 13, 2008 || Pla D'Arguines || R. Ferrando || — || align=right data-sort-value="0.99" | 990 m || 
|-id=203 bgcolor=#fefefe
| 375203 ||  || — || March 6, 2008 || Mount Lemmon || Mount Lemmon Survey || — || align=right data-sort-value="0.78" | 780 m || 
|-id=204 bgcolor=#fefefe
| 375204 ||  || — || March 3, 2008 || Catalina || CSS || FLO || align=right data-sort-value="0.80" | 800 m || 
|-id=205 bgcolor=#fefefe
| 375205 ||  || — || March 5, 2008 || Mount Lemmon || Mount Lemmon Survey || V || align=right data-sort-value="0.69" | 690 m || 
|-id=206 bgcolor=#fefefe
| 375206 ||  || — || March 1, 2008 || Kitt Peak || Spacewatch || FLO || align=right data-sort-value="0.72" | 720 m || 
|-id=207 bgcolor=#fefefe
| 375207 ||  || — || March 8, 2008 || Kitt Peak || Spacewatch || — || align=right data-sort-value="0.67" | 670 m || 
|-id=208 bgcolor=#fefefe
| 375208 ||  || — || March 9, 2008 || Kitt Peak || Spacewatch || NYS || align=right data-sort-value="0.63" | 630 m || 
|-id=209 bgcolor=#fefefe
| 375209 ||  || — || March 11, 2008 || Kitt Peak || Spacewatch || V || align=right data-sort-value="0.57" | 570 m || 
|-id=210 bgcolor=#fefefe
| 375210 ||  || — || March 1, 2008 || Kitt Peak || Spacewatch || NYS || align=right data-sort-value="0.58" | 580 m || 
|-id=211 bgcolor=#C2FFFF
| 375211 ||  || — || March 12, 2008 || Kitt Peak || Spacewatch || L5 || align=right | 12 km || 
|-id=212 bgcolor=#fefefe
| 375212 ||  || — || March 25, 2008 || Kitt Peak || Spacewatch || V || align=right data-sort-value="0.78" | 780 m || 
|-id=213 bgcolor=#fefefe
| 375213 ||  || — || March 26, 2008 || Mount Lemmon || Mount Lemmon Survey || — || align=right data-sort-value="0.78" | 780 m || 
|-id=214 bgcolor=#fefefe
| 375214 ||  || — || February 8, 2008 || Kitt Peak || Spacewatch || — || align=right data-sort-value="0.91" | 910 m || 
|-id=215 bgcolor=#fefefe
| 375215 ||  || — || March 26, 2008 || Kitt Peak || Spacewatch || — || align=right | 1.1 km || 
|-id=216 bgcolor=#fefefe
| 375216 ||  || — || March 27, 2008 || Kitt Peak || Spacewatch || MAS || align=right data-sort-value="0.77" | 770 m || 
|-id=217 bgcolor=#fefefe
| 375217 ||  || — || March 27, 2008 || Kitt Peak || Spacewatch || NYS || align=right data-sort-value="0.80" | 800 m || 
|-id=218 bgcolor=#fefefe
| 375218 ||  || — || March 28, 2008 || Mount Lemmon || Mount Lemmon Survey || — || align=right data-sort-value="0.87" | 870 m || 
|-id=219 bgcolor=#fefefe
| 375219 ||  || — || February 10, 2008 || Mount Lemmon || Mount Lemmon Survey || — || align=right data-sort-value="0.66" | 660 m || 
|-id=220 bgcolor=#fefefe
| 375220 ||  || — || March 28, 2008 || Mount Lemmon || Mount Lemmon Survey || — || align=right data-sort-value="0.60" | 600 m || 
|-id=221 bgcolor=#fefefe
| 375221 ||  || — || March 28, 2008 || Mount Lemmon || Mount Lemmon Survey || V || align=right data-sort-value="0.75" | 750 m || 
|-id=222 bgcolor=#d6d6d6
| 375222 ||  || — || July 22, 1995 || Kitt Peak || Spacewatch || KOR || align=right | 1.2 km || 
|-id=223 bgcolor=#E9E9E9
| 375223 ||  || — || March 28, 2008 || Mount Lemmon || Mount Lemmon Survey || — || align=right data-sort-value="0.84" | 840 m || 
|-id=224 bgcolor=#fefefe
| 375224 ||  || — || March 28, 2008 || Mount Lemmon || Mount Lemmon Survey || — || align=right data-sort-value="0.88" | 880 m || 
|-id=225 bgcolor=#E9E9E9
| 375225 ||  || — || March 28, 2008 || Mount Lemmon || Mount Lemmon Survey || — || align=right data-sort-value="0.94" | 940 m || 
|-id=226 bgcolor=#fefefe
| 375226 ||  || — || March 28, 2008 || Mount Lemmon || Mount Lemmon Survey || NYS || align=right data-sort-value="0.65" | 650 m || 
|-id=227 bgcolor=#fefefe
| 375227 ||  || — || March 28, 2008 || Mount Lemmon || Mount Lemmon Survey || NYS || align=right data-sort-value="0.73" | 730 m || 
|-id=228 bgcolor=#fefefe
| 375228 ||  || — || March 27, 2008 || Mount Lemmon || Mount Lemmon Survey || — || align=right data-sort-value="0.78" | 780 m || 
|-id=229 bgcolor=#fefefe
| 375229 ||  || — || March 28, 2008 || Kitt Peak || Spacewatch || SUL || align=right | 2.4 km || 
|-id=230 bgcolor=#fefefe
| 375230 ||  || — || March 28, 2008 || Mount Lemmon || Mount Lemmon Survey || FLO || align=right data-sort-value="0.58" | 580 m || 
|-id=231 bgcolor=#C2FFFF
| 375231 ||  || — || March 29, 2008 || Kitt Peak || Spacewatch || L5 || align=right | 9.6 km || 
|-id=232 bgcolor=#fefefe
| 375232 ||  || — || March 30, 2008 || Kitt Peak || Spacewatch || — || align=right data-sort-value="0.96" | 960 m || 
|-id=233 bgcolor=#fefefe
| 375233 ||  || — || March 30, 2008 || Kitt Peak || Spacewatch || FLO || align=right data-sort-value="0.65" | 650 m || 
|-id=234 bgcolor=#E9E9E9
| 375234 ||  || — || March 30, 2008 || Kitt Peak || Spacewatch || — || align=right data-sort-value="0.95" | 950 m || 
|-id=235 bgcolor=#fefefe
| 375235 ||  || — || March 31, 2008 || Mount Lemmon || Mount Lemmon Survey || — || align=right data-sort-value="0.80" | 800 m || 
|-id=236 bgcolor=#fefefe
| 375236 ||  || — || March 31, 2008 || Kitt Peak || Spacewatch || — || align=right data-sort-value="0.97" | 970 m || 
|-id=237 bgcolor=#C2FFFF
| 375237 ||  || — || February 25, 1995 || Kitt Peak || Spacewatch || L5 || align=right | 9.4 km || 
|-id=238 bgcolor=#fefefe
| 375238 ||  || — || March 11, 2008 || Kitt Peak || Spacewatch || — || align=right data-sort-value="0.85" | 850 m || 
|-id=239 bgcolor=#fefefe
| 375239 ||  || — || February 29, 2008 || Kitt Peak || Spacewatch || — || align=right data-sort-value="0.70" | 700 m || 
|-id=240 bgcolor=#E9E9E9
| 375240 ||  || — || April 1, 2008 || Kitt Peak || Spacewatch || — || align=right | 1.0 km || 
|-id=241 bgcolor=#C2FFFF
| 375241 ||  || — || April 1, 2008 || Kitt Peak || Spacewatch || L5 || align=right | 15 km || 
|-id=242 bgcolor=#fefefe
| 375242 ||  || — || April 3, 2008 || Kitt Peak || Spacewatch || NYS || align=right data-sort-value="0.66" | 660 m || 
|-id=243 bgcolor=#E9E9E9
| 375243 ||  || — || April 3, 2008 || Kitt Peak || Spacewatch || — || align=right | 1.4 km || 
|-id=244 bgcolor=#C2FFFF
| 375244 ||  || — || April 3, 2008 || Kitt Peak || Spacewatch || L5 || align=right | 11 km || 
|-id=245 bgcolor=#fefefe
| 375245 ||  || — || April 4, 2008 || Kitt Peak || Spacewatch || — || align=right | 1.2 km || 
|-id=246 bgcolor=#fefefe
| 375246 ||  || — || April 5, 2008 || Mount Lemmon || Mount Lemmon Survey || — || align=right data-sort-value="0.78" | 780 m || 
|-id=247 bgcolor=#E9E9E9
| 375247 ||  || — || April 5, 2008 || Kitt Peak || Spacewatch || JUN || align=right data-sort-value="0.95" | 950 m || 
|-id=248 bgcolor=#fefefe
| 375248 ||  || — || April 6, 2008 || Kitt Peak || Spacewatch || V || align=right data-sort-value="0.83" | 830 m || 
|-id=249 bgcolor=#fefefe
| 375249 ||  || — || April 6, 2008 || Kitt Peak || Spacewatch || — || align=right | 1.0 km || 
|-id=250 bgcolor=#fefefe
| 375250 ||  || — || April 6, 2008 || Mount Lemmon || Mount Lemmon Survey || — || align=right data-sort-value="0.99" | 990 m || 
|-id=251 bgcolor=#E9E9E9
| 375251 ||  || — || April 8, 2008 || Kitt Peak || Spacewatch || — || align=right | 1.8 km || 
|-id=252 bgcolor=#C2FFFF
| 375252 ||  || — || April 6, 2008 || Kitt Peak || Spacewatch || L5 || align=right | 12 km || 
|-id=253 bgcolor=#C2FFFF
| 375253 ||  || — || March 13, 2007 || Mount Lemmon || Mount Lemmon Survey || L5 || align=right | 7.5 km || 
|-id=254 bgcolor=#fefefe
| 375254 ||  || — || April 6, 2008 || Mount Lemmon || Mount Lemmon Survey || — || align=right data-sort-value="0.67" | 670 m || 
|-id=255 bgcolor=#fefefe
| 375255 ||  || — || April 6, 2008 || Mount Lemmon || Mount Lemmon Survey || — || align=right data-sort-value="0.85" | 850 m || 
|-id=256 bgcolor=#fefefe
| 375256 ||  || — || April 7, 2008 || Kitt Peak || Spacewatch || PHO || align=right | 2.9 km || 
|-id=257 bgcolor=#C2FFFF
| 375257 ||  || — || April 9, 2008 || Kitt Peak || Spacewatch || L5 || align=right | 12 km || 
|-id=258 bgcolor=#fefefe
| 375258 ||  || — || December 16, 2006 || Kitt Peak || Spacewatch || NYS || align=right data-sort-value="0.97" | 970 m || 
|-id=259 bgcolor=#C2FFFF
| 375259 ||  || — || April 11, 2008 || Kitt Peak || Spacewatch || L5 || align=right | 16 km || 
|-id=260 bgcolor=#fefefe
| 375260 ||  || — || April 11, 2008 || Kitt Peak || Spacewatch || — || align=right data-sort-value="0.84" | 840 m || 
|-id=261 bgcolor=#E9E9E9
| 375261 ||  || — || March 30, 2008 || Kitt Peak || Spacewatch || — || align=right | 1.1 km || 
|-id=262 bgcolor=#E9E9E9
| 375262 ||  || — || April 6, 2008 || Kitt Peak || Spacewatch || — || align=right data-sort-value="0.93" | 930 m || 
|-id=263 bgcolor=#E9E9E9
| 375263 ||  || — || April 7, 2008 || Kitt Peak || Spacewatch || — || align=right data-sort-value="0.88" | 880 m || 
|-id=264 bgcolor=#fefefe
| 375264 ||  || — || September 27, 2006 || Mount Lemmon || Mount Lemmon Survey || V || align=right data-sort-value="0.70" | 700 m || 
|-id=265 bgcolor=#C2FFFF
| 375265 ||  || — || April 3, 2008 || Mount Lemmon || Mount Lemmon Survey || L5 || align=right | 16 km || 
|-id=266 bgcolor=#C2FFFF
| 375266 ||  || — || April 15, 2008 || Mount Lemmon || Mount Lemmon Survey || L5 || align=right | 9.9 km || 
|-id=267 bgcolor=#fefefe
| 375267 ||  || — || April 6, 2008 || Catalina || CSS || SVE || align=right | 2.4 km || 
|-id=268 bgcolor=#fefefe
| 375268 ||  || — || April 24, 2008 || Mount Lemmon || Mount Lemmon Survey || V || align=right data-sort-value="0.60" | 600 m || 
|-id=269 bgcolor=#E9E9E9
| 375269 ||  || — || April 24, 2008 || Kitt Peak || Spacewatch || — || align=right data-sort-value="0.98" | 980 m || 
|-id=270 bgcolor=#E9E9E9
| 375270 ||  || — || April 25, 2008 || Kitt Peak || Spacewatch || EUN || align=right | 2.5 km || 
|-id=271 bgcolor=#fefefe
| 375271 ||  || — || April 26, 2008 || Kitt Peak || Spacewatch || — || align=right | 1.2 km || 
|-id=272 bgcolor=#E9E9E9
| 375272 ||  || — || April 30, 2008 || Socorro || LINEAR || JUN || align=right | 1.5 km || 
|-id=273 bgcolor=#E9E9E9
| 375273 ||  || — || March 5, 2008 || Mount Lemmon || Mount Lemmon Survey || — || align=right | 1.1 km || 
|-id=274 bgcolor=#E9E9E9
| 375274 ||  || — || April 28, 2008 || Mount Lemmon || Mount Lemmon Survey || — || align=right | 2.0 km || 
|-id=275 bgcolor=#E9E9E9
| 375275 ||  || — || April 29, 2008 || Kitt Peak || Spacewatch || GER || align=right | 1.4 km || 
|-id=276 bgcolor=#fefefe
| 375276 ||  || — || April 29, 2008 || Kitt Peak || Spacewatch || V || align=right data-sort-value="0.92" | 920 m || 
|-id=277 bgcolor=#fefefe
| 375277 ||  || — || April 30, 2008 || Mount Lemmon || Mount Lemmon Survey || V || align=right data-sort-value="0.78" | 780 m || 
|-id=278 bgcolor=#E9E9E9
| 375278 ||  || — || April 14, 2008 || Kitt Peak || Spacewatch || — || align=right data-sort-value="0.94" | 940 m || 
|-id=279 bgcolor=#E9E9E9
| 375279 ||  || — || April 30, 2008 || Mount Lemmon || Mount Lemmon Survey || EUN || align=right | 1.2 km || 
|-id=280 bgcolor=#E9E9E9
| 375280 ||  || — || April 16, 2008 || Mount Lemmon || Mount Lemmon Survey || — || align=right | 1.5 km || 
|-id=281 bgcolor=#fefefe
| 375281 ||  || — || May 5, 2008 || Mount Lemmon || Mount Lemmon Survey || — || align=right | 1.0 km || 
|-id=282 bgcolor=#E9E9E9
| 375282 ||  || — || May 27, 2008 || Kitt Peak || Spacewatch || — || align=right | 1.1 km || 
|-id=283 bgcolor=#E9E9E9
| 375283 ||  || — || May 27, 2008 || Kitt Peak || Spacewatch || — || align=right data-sort-value="0.89" | 890 m || 
|-id=284 bgcolor=#E9E9E9
| 375284 ||  || — || May 28, 2008 || Kitt Peak || Spacewatch || — || align=right data-sort-value="0.84" | 840 m || 
|-id=285 bgcolor=#E9E9E9
| 375285 ||  || — || May 30, 2008 || Kitt Peak || Spacewatch || — || align=right | 1.1 km || 
|-id=286 bgcolor=#E9E9E9
| 375286 ||  || — || May 29, 2008 || Kitt Peak || Spacewatch || EUN || align=right | 1.3 km || 
|-id=287 bgcolor=#E9E9E9
| 375287 ||  || — || May 7, 2008 || Mount Lemmon || Mount Lemmon Survey || RAF || align=right | 1.1 km || 
|-id=288 bgcolor=#E9E9E9
| 375288 ||  || — || June 1, 2008 || Mount Lemmon || Mount Lemmon Survey || MAR || align=right data-sort-value="0.72" | 720 m || 
|-id=289 bgcolor=#E9E9E9
| 375289 ||  || — || May 24, 2004 || Socorro || LINEAR || JUL || align=right | 1.2 km || 
|-id=290 bgcolor=#E9E9E9
| 375290 ||  || — || May 3, 2008 || Mount Lemmon || Mount Lemmon Survey || — || align=right | 1.9 km || 
|-id=291 bgcolor=#E9E9E9
| 375291 ||  || — || June 7, 2008 || Kitt Peak || Spacewatch || ADE || align=right | 1.6 km || 
|-id=292 bgcolor=#E9E9E9
| 375292 ||  || — || June 10, 2008 || Kitt Peak || Spacewatch || — || align=right | 2.9 km || 
|-id=293 bgcolor=#E9E9E9
| 375293 ||  || — || July 26, 2008 || La Sagra || OAM Obs. || DOR || align=right | 3.2 km || 
|-id=294 bgcolor=#E9E9E9
| 375294 ||  || — || July 25, 2008 || Siding Spring || SSS || MRX || align=right | 1.3 km || 
|-id=295 bgcolor=#E9E9E9
| 375295 ||  || — || July 29, 2008 || La Sagra || OAM Obs. || — || align=right | 4.1 km || 
|-id=296 bgcolor=#E9E9E9
| 375296 ||  || — || August 5, 2008 || La Sagra || OAM Obs. || — || align=right | 2.7 km || 
|-id=297 bgcolor=#E9E9E9
| 375297 ||  || — || August 5, 2008 || La Sagra || OAM Obs. || — || align=right | 1.8 km || 
|-id=298 bgcolor=#E9E9E9
| 375298 ||  || — || August 7, 2008 || La Sagra || OAM Obs. || INO || align=right | 1.4 km || 
|-id=299 bgcolor=#E9E9E9
| 375299 ||  || — || October 10, 2004 || Socorro || LINEAR || — || align=right | 2.9 km || 
|-id=300 bgcolor=#E9E9E9
| 375300 ||  || — || July 28, 2008 || Črni Vrh || Črni Vrh || — || align=right | 2.4 km || 
|}

375301–375400 

|-bgcolor=#E9E9E9
| 375301 ||  || — || August 11, 2008 || Črni Vrh || Črni Vrh || — || align=right | 2.9 km || 
|-id=302 bgcolor=#d6d6d6
| 375302 ||  || — || August 6, 2008 || Siding Spring || SSS || — || align=right | 2.4 km || 
|-id=303 bgcolor=#E9E9E9
| 375303 ||  || — || August 26, 2008 || La Sagra || OAM Obs. || INO || align=right | 1.6 km || 
|-id=304 bgcolor=#d6d6d6
| 375304 ||  || — || July 29, 2008 || Mount Lemmon || Mount Lemmon Survey || BRA || align=right | 1.7 km || 
|-id=305 bgcolor=#d6d6d6
| 375305 ||  || — || August 26, 2008 || Socorro || LINEAR || — || align=right | 4.1 km || 
|-id=306 bgcolor=#E9E9E9
| 375306 ||  || — || August 27, 2008 || La Sagra || OAM Obs. || — || align=right | 3.3 km || 
|-id=307 bgcolor=#d6d6d6
| 375307 ||  || — || August 24, 2008 || Kitt Peak || Spacewatch || KOR || align=right | 1.3 km || 
|-id=308 bgcolor=#E9E9E9
| 375308 ||  || — || September 3, 2008 || Kitt Peak || Spacewatch || — || align=right | 2.6 km || 
|-id=309 bgcolor=#d6d6d6
| 375309 ||  || — || September 4, 2008 || Kitt Peak || Spacewatch || — || align=right | 2.8 km || 
|-id=310 bgcolor=#d6d6d6
| 375310 ||  || — || September 4, 2008 || Kitt Peak || Spacewatch || — || align=right | 2.8 km || 
|-id=311 bgcolor=#E9E9E9
| 375311 ||  || — || September 8, 2008 || Altschwendt || W. Ries || — || align=right | 3.2 km || 
|-id=312 bgcolor=#E9E9E9
| 375312 ||  || — || September 2, 2008 || Kitt Peak || Spacewatch || — || align=right | 2.1 km || 
|-id=313 bgcolor=#E9E9E9
| 375313 ||  || — || September 2, 2008 || Kitt Peak || Spacewatch || — || align=right | 2.2 km || 
|-id=314 bgcolor=#d6d6d6
| 375314 ||  || — || September 2, 2008 || Kitt Peak || Spacewatch || — || align=right | 1.8 km || 
|-id=315 bgcolor=#E9E9E9
| 375315 ||  || — || September 3, 2008 || La Sagra || OAM Obs. || — || align=right | 3.4 km || 
|-id=316 bgcolor=#d6d6d6
| 375316 ||  || — || September 4, 2008 || Kitt Peak || Spacewatch || — || align=right | 3.5 km || 
|-id=317 bgcolor=#d6d6d6
| 375317 ||  || — || September 4, 2008 || Kitt Peak || Spacewatch || — || align=right | 2.9 km || 
|-id=318 bgcolor=#E9E9E9
| 375318 ||  || — || September 2, 2008 || La Sagra || OAM Obs. || MRX || align=right | 1.4 km || 
|-id=319 bgcolor=#E9E9E9
| 375319 ||  || — || September 4, 2008 || Kitt Peak || Spacewatch || — || align=right | 2.5 km || 
|-id=320 bgcolor=#d6d6d6
| 375320 ||  || — || July 29, 2008 || Mount Lemmon || Mount Lemmon Survey || — || align=right | 2.8 km || 
|-id=321 bgcolor=#d6d6d6
| 375321 ||  || — || September 5, 2008 || Kitt Peak || Spacewatch || EOS || align=right | 1.9 km || 
|-id=322 bgcolor=#d6d6d6
| 375322 ||  || — || September 2, 2008 || Moletai || Molėtai Obs. || — || align=right | 2.9 km || 
|-id=323 bgcolor=#d6d6d6
| 375323 ||  || — || September 2, 2008 || Kitt Peak || Spacewatch || — || align=right | 2.6 km || 
|-id=324 bgcolor=#d6d6d6
| 375324 ||  || — || February 25, 2006 || Kitt Peak || Spacewatch || SAN || align=right | 1.2 km || 
|-id=325 bgcolor=#d6d6d6
| 375325 ||  || — || September 4, 2008 || Kitt Peak || Spacewatch || — || align=right | 3.0 km || 
|-id=326 bgcolor=#d6d6d6
| 375326 ||  || — || September 9, 2008 || Mount Lemmon || Mount Lemmon Survey || K-2 || align=right | 1.5 km || 
|-id=327 bgcolor=#E9E9E9
| 375327 ||  || — || September 9, 2008 || Mount Lemmon || Mount Lemmon Survey || WIT || align=right | 1.2 km || 
|-id=328 bgcolor=#d6d6d6
| 375328 ||  || — || September 9, 2008 || Mount Lemmon || Mount Lemmon Survey || — || align=right | 2.8 km || 
|-id=329 bgcolor=#d6d6d6
| 375329 ||  || — || September 9, 2008 || Mount Lemmon || Mount Lemmon Survey || — || align=right | 2.7 km || 
|-id=330 bgcolor=#E9E9E9
| 375330 ||  || — || September 6, 2008 || Catalina || CSS || — || align=right | 3.1 km || 
|-id=331 bgcolor=#d6d6d6
| 375331 ||  || — || September 4, 2008 || Kitt Peak || Spacewatch || BRA || align=right | 1.9 km || 
|-id=332 bgcolor=#d6d6d6
| 375332 ||  || — || September 5, 2008 || Socorro || LINEAR || — || align=right | 3.3 km || 
|-id=333 bgcolor=#d6d6d6
| 375333 ||  || — || September 3, 2008 || Kitt Peak || Spacewatch || KOR || align=right | 1.3 km || 
|-id=334 bgcolor=#d6d6d6
| 375334 ||  || — || September 6, 2008 || Kitt Peak || Spacewatch || KOR || align=right | 1.3 km || 
|-id=335 bgcolor=#E9E9E9
| 375335 || 2008 SN || — || September 18, 2008 || Sandlot || G. Hug || — || align=right | 2.8 km || 
|-id=336 bgcolor=#d6d6d6
| 375336 ||  || — || September 21, 2008 || Hibiscus || N. Teamo || — || align=right | 3.1 km || 
|-id=337 bgcolor=#E9E9E9
| 375337 ||  || — || September 22, 2008 || Socorro || LINEAR || — || align=right | 3.2 km || 
|-id=338 bgcolor=#E9E9E9
| 375338 ||  || — || September 22, 2008 || Socorro || LINEAR || GEF || align=right | 1.6 km || 
|-id=339 bgcolor=#d6d6d6
| 375339 ||  || — || September 2, 2008 || Kitt Peak || Spacewatch || EOS || align=right | 2.2 km || 
|-id=340 bgcolor=#E9E9E9
| 375340 ||  || — || September 9, 2008 || Mount Lemmon || Mount Lemmon Survey || GEF || align=right | 2.8 km || 
|-id=341 bgcolor=#E9E9E9
| 375341 ||  || — || September 19, 2008 || Kitt Peak || Spacewatch || — || align=right | 1.7 km || 
|-id=342 bgcolor=#d6d6d6
| 375342 ||  || — || September 19, 2008 || Kitt Peak || Spacewatch || KAR || align=right | 1.3 km || 
|-id=343 bgcolor=#E9E9E9
| 375343 ||  || — || September 7, 2008 || Catalina || CSS || — || align=right | 2.6 km || 
|-id=344 bgcolor=#E9E9E9
| 375344 ||  || — || September 20, 2008 || Kitt Peak || Spacewatch || DOR || align=right | 2.7 km || 
|-id=345 bgcolor=#d6d6d6
| 375345 ||  || — || September 20, 2008 || Mount Lemmon || Mount Lemmon Survey || — || align=right | 1.8 km || 
|-id=346 bgcolor=#E9E9E9
| 375346 ||  || — || September 20, 2008 || Mount Lemmon || Mount Lemmon Survey || HOF || align=right | 2.3 km || 
|-id=347 bgcolor=#d6d6d6
| 375347 ||  || — || September 20, 2008 || Mount Lemmon || Mount Lemmon Survey || KOR || align=right | 1.5 km || 
|-id=348 bgcolor=#d6d6d6
| 375348 ||  || — || September 20, 2008 || Mount Lemmon || Mount Lemmon Survey || — || align=right | 2.4 km || 
|-id=349 bgcolor=#d6d6d6
| 375349 ||  || — || September 20, 2008 || Mount Lemmon || Mount Lemmon Survey || — || align=right | 2.4 km || 
|-id=350 bgcolor=#d6d6d6
| 375350 ||  || — || September 20, 2008 || Kitt Peak || Spacewatch || — || align=right | 2.6 km || 
|-id=351 bgcolor=#d6d6d6
| 375351 ||  || — || September 20, 2008 || Kitt Peak || Spacewatch || — || align=right | 2.3 km || 
|-id=352 bgcolor=#d6d6d6
| 375352 ||  || — || September 20, 2008 || Kitt Peak || Spacewatch || — || align=right | 3.5 km || 
|-id=353 bgcolor=#E9E9E9
| 375353 ||  || — || September 20, 2008 || Catalina || CSS || AGN || align=right | 1.6 km || 
|-id=354 bgcolor=#E9E9E9
| 375354 ||  || — || September 23, 2008 || Mount Lemmon || Mount Lemmon Survey || DOR || align=right | 2.8 km || 
|-id=355 bgcolor=#d6d6d6
| 375355 ||  || — || September 23, 2008 || Mount Lemmon || Mount Lemmon Survey || — || align=right | 3.0 km || 
|-id=356 bgcolor=#d6d6d6
| 375356 ||  || — || September 20, 2008 || Mount Lemmon || Mount Lemmon Survey || KOR || align=right | 1.3 km || 
|-id=357 bgcolor=#d6d6d6
| 375357 ||  || — || September 21, 2008 || Kitt Peak || Spacewatch || EOS || align=right | 3.8 km || 
|-id=358 bgcolor=#d6d6d6
| 375358 ||  || — || September 21, 2008 || Mount Lemmon || Mount Lemmon Survey || — || align=right | 3.0 km || 
|-id=359 bgcolor=#d6d6d6
| 375359 ||  || — || September 21, 2008 || Kitt Peak || Spacewatch || — || align=right | 3.0 km || 
|-id=360 bgcolor=#d6d6d6
| 375360 ||  || — || September 21, 2008 || Kitt Peak || Spacewatch || — || align=right | 3.1 km || 
|-id=361 bgcolor=#d6d6d6
| 375361 ||  || — || September 22, 2008 || Kitt Peak || Spacewatch || — || align=right | 3.1 km || 
|-id=362 bgcolor=#d6d6d6
| 375362 ||  || — || September 22, 2008 || Mount Lemmon || Mount Lemmon Survey || — || align=right | 2.5 km || 
|-id=363 bgcolor=#d6d6d6
| 375363 ||  || — || September 22, 2008 || Mount Lemmon || Mount Lemmon Survey || — || align=right | 3.2 km || 
|-id=364 bgcolor=#d6d6d6
| 375364 ||  || — || September 22, 2008 || Mount Lemmon || Mount Lemmon Survey || — || align=right | 2.2 km || 
|-id=365 bgcolor=#d6d6d6
| 375365 ||  || — || September 22, 2008 || Mount Lemmon || Mount Lemmon Survey || — || align=right | 3.2 km || 
|-id=366 bgcolor=#d6d6d6
| 375366 ||  || — || September 22, 2008 || Mount Lemmon || Mount Lemmon Survey || — || align=right | 2.3 km || 
|-id=367 bgcolor=#d6d6d6
| 375367 ||  || — || September 22, 2008 || Kitt Peak || Spacewatch || — || align=right | 3.0 km || 
|-id=368 bgcolor=#d6d6d6
| 375368 ||  || — || September 22, 2008 || Kitt Peak || Spacewatch || EOS || align=right | 1.6 km || 
|-id=369 bgcolor=#d6d6d6
| 375369 ||  || — || September 22, 2008 || Kitt Peak || Spacewatch || ANF || align=right | 1.7 km || 
|-id=370 bgcolor=#d6d6d6
| 375370 ||  || — || September 22, 2008 || Kitt Peak || Spacewatch || EOS || align=right | 2.1 km || 
|-id=371 bgcolor=#d6d6d6
| 375371 ||  || — || September 22, 2008 || Kitt Peak || Spacewatch || KOR || align=right | 1.6 km || 
|-id=372 bgcolor=#d6d6d6
| 375372 ||  || — || September 23, 2008 || Kitt Peak || Spacewatch || EOS || align=right | 1.6 km || 
|-id=373 bgcolor=#d6d6d6
| 375373 ||  || — || September 24, 2008 || Mount Lemmon || Mount Lemmon Survey || — || align=right | 3.5 km || 
|-id=374 bgcolor=#d6d6d6
| 375374 ||  || — || September 23, 2008 || Kitt Peak || Spacewatch || — || align=right | 2.7 km || 
|-id=375 bgcolor=#d6d6d6
| 375375 ||  || — || September 25, 2008 || Goodricke-Pigott || R. A. Tucker || — || align=right | 2.2 km || 
|-id=376 bgcolor=#d6d6d6
| 375376 ||  || — || September 23, 2008 || Kitt Peak || Spacewatch || EOS || align=right | 2.1 km || 
|-id=377 bgcolor=#d6d6d6
| 375377 ||  || — || September 28, 2008 || Dauban || F. Kugel || FIR || align=right | 3.6 km || 
|-id=378 bgcolor=#E9E9E9
| 375378 ||  || — || August 23, 2008 || Kitt Peak || Spacewatch || AGN || align=right | 1.7 km || 
|-id=379 bgcolor=#d6d6d6
| 375379 ||  || — || September 3, 2008 || Kitt Peak || Spacewatch || — || align=right | 2.8 km || 
|-id=380 bgcolor=#E9E9E9
| 375380 ||  || — || September 30, 2008 || Socorro || LINEAR || XIZ || align=right | 1.6 km || 
|-id=381 bgcolor=#d6d6d6
| 375381 ||  || — || September 24, 2008 || Kitt Peak || Spacewatch || — || align=right | 2.1 km || 
|-id=382 bgcolor=#d6d6d6
| 375382 ||  || — || September 24, 2008 || Kitt Peak || Spacewatch || — || align=right | 3.7 km || 
|-id=383 bgcolor=#d6d6d6
| 375383 ||  || — || September 25, 2008 || Kitt Peak || Spacewatch || — || align=right | 4.1 km || 
|-id=384 bgcolor=#d6d6d6
| 375384 ||  || — || September 25, 2008 || Kitt Peak || Spacewatch || — || align=right | 2.5 km || 
|-id=385 bgcolor=#d6d6d6
| 375385 ||  || — || September 25, 2008 || Kitt Peak || Spacewatch || — || align=right | 5.0 km || 
|-id=386 bgcolor=#d6d6d6
| 375386 ||  || — || September 26, 2008 || Kitt Peak || Spacewatch || — || align=right | 2.5 km || 
|-id=387 bgcolor=#d6d6d6
| 375387 ||  || — || September 26, 2008 || Kitt Peak || Spacewatch || EOS || align=right | 2.0 km || 
|-id=388 bgcolor=#d6d6d6
| 375388 ||  || — || September 26, 2008 || Kitt Peak || Spacewatch || — || align=right | 3.4 km || 
|-id=389 bgcolor=#E9E9E9
| 375389 ||  || — || September 30, 2008 || La Sagra || OAM Obs. || HOF || align=right | 3.4 km || 
|-id=390 bgcolor=#d6d6d6
| 375390 ||  || — || September 25, 2008 || Kitt Peak || Spacewatch || KOR || align=right | 1.3 km || 
|-id=391 bgcolor=#d6d6d6
| 375391 ||  || — || September 26, 2008 || Kitt Peak || Spacewatch || BRA || align=right | 1.6 km || 
|-id=392 bgcolor=#d6d6d6
| 375392 ||  || — || September 26, 2008 || Kitt Peak || Spacewatch || — || align=right | 5.1 km || 
|-id=393 bgcolor=#d6d6d6
| 375393 ||  || — || October 21, 2003 || Kitt Peak || Spacewatch || EOS || align=right | 1.7 km || 
|-id=394 bgcolor=#d6d6d6
| 375394 ||  || — || September 29, 2008 || Kitt Peak || Spacewatch || EOS || align=right | 2.0 km || 
|-id=395 bgcolor=#d6d6d6
| 375395 ||  || — || September 21, 2008 || Kitt Peak || Spacewatch || — || align=right | 2.8 km || 
|-id=396 bgcolor=#d6d6d6
| 375396 ||  || — || September 29, 2008 || Kitt Peak || Spacewatch || THM || align=right | 2.1 km || 
|-id=397 bgcolor=#d6d6d6
| 375397 ||  || — || September 29, 2008 || Kitt Peak || Spacewatch || — || align=right | 3.2 km || 
|-id=398 bgcolor=#d6d6d6
| 375398 ||  || — || September 23, 2008 || Kitt Peak || Spacewatch || — || align=right | 2.8 km || 
|-id=399 bgcolor=#d6d6d6
| 375399 ||  || — || September 24, 2008 || Catalina || CSS || TEL || align=right | 1.8 km || 
|-id=400 bgcolor=#d6d6d6
| 375400 ||  || — || September 24, 2008 || Kitt Peak || Spacewatch || KOR || align=right | 1.4 km || 
|}

375401–375500 

|-bgcolor=#d6d6d6
| 375401 ||  || — || September 21, 2008 || Kitt Peak || Spacewatch || — || align=right | 3.8 km || 
|-id=402 bgcolor=#d6d6d6
| 375402 ||  || — || September 22, 2008 || Catalina || CSS || — || align=right | 2.8 km || 
|-id=403 bgcolor=#d6d6d6
| 375403 ||  || — || September 24, 2008 || Kitt Peak || Spacewatch || — || align=right | 3.6 km || 
|-id=404 bgcolor=#d6d6d6
| 375404 ||  || — || September 22, 2008 || Mount Lemmon || Mount Lemmon Survey || — || align=right | 3.5 km || 
|-id=405 bgcolor=#d6d6d6
| 375405 ||  || — || September 24, 2008 || Kitt Peak || Spacewatch || KOR || align=right | 1.2 km || 
|-id=406 bgcolor=#d6d6d6
| 375406 ||  || — || September 28, 2008 || Mount Lemmon || Mount Lemmon Survey || — || align=right | 3.2 km || 
|-id=407 bgcolor=#d6d6d6
| 375407 ||  || — || September 29, 2008 || Kitt Peak || Spacewatch || — || align=right | 2.3 km || 
|-id=408 bgcolor=#d6d6d6
| 375408 ||  || — || September 26, 2008 || Kitt Peak || Spacewatch || — || align=right | 2.8 km || 
|-id=409 bgcolor=#d6d6d6
| 375409 ||  || — || September 21, 2008 || Catalina || CSS || — || align=right | 3.3 km || 
|-id=410 bgcolor=#d6d6d6
| 375410 ||  || — || September 24, 2008 || Mount Lemmon || Mount Lemmon Survey || — || align=right | 2.3 km || 
|-id=411 bgcolor=#d6d6d6
| 375411 ||  || — || September 22, 2008 || Kitt Peak || Spacewatch || TIR || align=right | 3.8 km || 
|-id=412 bgcolor=#d6d6d6
| 375412 ||  || — || September 22, 2008 || Mount Lemmon || Mount Lemmon Survey || — || align=right | 2.7 km || 
|-id=413 bgcolor=#d6d6d6
| 375413 ||  || — || September 23, 2008 || Kitt Peak || Spacewatch || — || align=right | 2.2 km || 
|-id=414 bgcolor=#E9E9E9
| 375414 ||  || — || September 21, 2008 || Kitt Peak || Spacewatch || — || align=right | 2.2 km || 
|-id=415 bgcolor=#d6d6d6
| 375415 ||  || — || September 23, 2008 || Catalina || CSS || — || align=right | 4.2 km || 
|-id=416 bgcolor=#d6d6d6
| 375416 ||  || — || September 29, 2008 || Catalina || CSS || — || align=right | 2.9 km || 
|-id=417 bgcolor=#d6d6d6
| 375417 ||  || — || September 29, 2008 || Catalina || CSS || — || align=right | 3.2 km || 
|-id=418 bgcolor=#d6d6d6
| 375418 ||  || — || September 21, 2008 || Kitt Peak || Spacewatch || EOS || align=right | 2.4 km || 
|-id=419 bgcolor=#d6d6d6
| 375419 ||  || — || September 23, 2008 || Kitt Peak || Spacewatch || — || align=right | 3.8 km || 
|-id=420 bgcolor=#d6d6d6
| 375420 ||  || — || September 28, 2008 || Mount Lemmon || Mount Lemmon Survey || — || align=right | 3.2 km || 
|-id=421 bgcolor=#E9E9E9
| 375421 ||  || — || September 29, 2008 || Catalina || CSS || TIN || align=right | 1.4 km || 
|-id=422 bgcolor=#d6d6d6
| 375422 ||  || — || September 29, 2008 || Catalina || CSS || — || align=right | 3.3 km || 
|-id=423 bgcolor=#d6d6d6
| 375423 ||  || — || September 30, 2008 || Catalina || CSS || — || align=right | 3.6 km || 
|-id=424 bgcolor=#d6d6d6
| 375424 ||  || — || September 22, 2008 || Mount Lemmon || Mount Lemmon Survey || — || align=right | 4.4 km || 
|-id=425 bgcolor=#d6d6d6
| 375425 ||  || — || October 3, 2008 || La Sagra || OAM Obs. || — || align=right | 2.4 km || 
|-id=426 bgcolor=#d6d6d6
| 375426 ||  || — || March 8, 2005 || Mount Lemmon || Mount Lemmon Survey || HYG || align=right | 2.7 km || 
|-id=427 bgcolor=#d6d6d6
| 375427 ||  || — || October 1, 2008 || Mount Lemmon || Mount Lemmon Survey || — || align=right | 2.5 km || 
|-id=428 bgcolor=#E9E9E9
| 375428 ||  || — || October 1, 2008 || La Sagra || OAM Obs. || — || align=right | 2.7 km || 
|-id=429 bgcolor=#d6d6d6
| 375429 ||  || — || October 1, 2008 || Kitt Peak || Spacewatch || CHA || align=right | 2.2 km || 
|-id=430 bgcolor=#d6d6d6
| 375430 ||  || — || October 1, 2008 || Kitt Peak || Spacewatch || KOR || align=right | 1.3 km || 
|-id=431 bgcolor=#d6d6d6
| 375431 ||  || — || October 1, 2008 || Catalina || CSS || TRP || align=right | 3.6 km || 
|-id=432 bgcolor=#d6d6d6
| 375432 ||  || — || October 2, 2008 || Kitt Peak || Spacewatch || — || align=right | 2.4 km || 
|-id=433 bgcolor=#d6d6d6
| 375433 ||  || — || October 2, 2008 || Kitt Peak || Spacewatch || — || align=right | 3.3 km || 
|-id=434 bgcolor=#d6d6d6
| 375434 ||  || — || October 2, 2008 || Kitt Peak || Spacewatch || KOR || align=right | 1.5 km || 
|-id=435 bgcolor=#d6d6d6
| 375435 ||  || — || October 2, 2008 || Kitt Peak || Spacewatch || EOS || align=right | 1.7 km || 
|-id=436 bgcolor=#d6d6d6
| 375436 ||  || — || October 2, 2008 || Kitt Peak || Spacewatch || — || align=right | 3.1 km || 
|-id=437 bgcolor=#d6d6d6
| 375437 ||  || — || October 2, 2008 || Kitt Peak || Spacewatch || EOS || align=right | 1.9 km || 
|-id=438 bgcolor=#d6d6d6
| 375438 ||  || — || October 2, 2008 || Kitt Peak || Spacewatch || — || align=right | 2.3 km || 
|-id=439 bgcolor=#d6d6d6
| 375439 ||  || — || September 2, 2008 || Kitt Peak || Spacewatch || KOR || align=right | 1.4 km || 
|-id=440 bgcolor=#d6d6d6
| 375440 ||  || — || October 2, 2008 || Mount Lemmon || Mount Lemmon Survey || — || align=right | 3.1 km || 
|-id=441 bgcolor=#d6d6d6
| 375441 ||  || — || October 2, 2008 || Mount Lemmon || Mount Lemmon Survey || THM || align=right | 1.8 km || 
|-id=442 bgcolor=#d6d6d6
| 375442 ||  || — || September 6, 2008 || Mount Lemmon || Mount Lemmon Survey || EOS || align=right | 2.1 km || 
|-id=443 bgcolor=#d6d6d6
| 375443 ||  || — || October 3, 2008 || Kitt Peak || Spacewatch || KOR || align=right | 1.5 km || 
|-id=444 bgcolor=#d6d6d6
| 375444 ||  || — || October 3, 2008 || Mount Lemmon || Mount Lemmon Survey || — || align=right | 1.7 km || 
|-id=445 bgcolor=#d6d6d6
| 375445 ||  || — || September 25, 2008 || Kitt Peak || Spacewatch || — || align=right | 2.5 km || 
|-id=446 bgcolor=#d6d6d6
| 375446 ||  || — || October 3, 2008 || Kitt Peak || Spacewatch || — || align=right | 2.9 km || 
|-id=447 bgcolor=#d6d6d6
| 375447 ||  || — || September 25, 2008 || Kitt Peak || Spacewatch || VER || align=right | 2.8 km || 
|-id=448 bgcolor=#d6d6d6
| 375448 ||  || — || October 3, 2008 || Kitt Peak || Spacewatch || KOR || align=right | 1.6 km || 
|-id=449 bgcolor=#d6d6d6
| 375449 ||  || — || October 4, 2008 || La Sagra || OAM Obs. || KAR || align=right | 1.00 km || 
|-id=450 bgcolor=#d6d6d6
| 375450 ||  || — || October 5, 2008 || La Sagra || OAM Obs. || KOR || align=right | 1.4 km || 
|-id=451 bgcolor=#d6d6d6
| 375451 ||  || — || October 6, 2008 || Kitt Peak || Spacewatch || EOS || align=right | 2.0 km || 
|-id=452 bgcolor=#d6d6d6
| 375452 ||  || — || October 6, 2008 || Kitt Peak || Spacewatch || EOS || align=right | 2.3 km || 
|-id=453 bgcolor=#d6d6d6
| 375453 ||  || — || October 6, 2008 || Kitt Peak || Spacewatch || — || align=right | 2.6 km || 
|-id=454 bgcolor=#d6d6d6
| 375454 ||  || — || October 6, 2008 || Kitt Peak || Spacewatch || — || align=right | 2.6 km || 
|-id=455 bgcolor=#d6d6d6
| 375455 ||  || — || October 6, 2008 || Mount Lemmon || Mount Lemmon Survey || CHA || align=right | 1.8 km || 
|-id=456 bgcolor=#E9E9E9
| 375456 ||  || — || October 6, 2008 || Mount Lemmon || Mount Lemmon Survey || — || align=right | 2.8 km || 
|-id=457 bgcolor=#fefefe
| 375457 ||  || — || October 7, 2008 || Catalina || CSS || H || align=right data-sort-value="0.68" | 680 m || 
|-id=458 bgcolor=#d6d6d6
| 375458 ||  || — || October 8, 2008 || Mount Lemmon || Mount Lemmon Survey || — || align=right | 2.8 km || 
|-id=459 bgcolor=#d6d6d6
| 375459 ||  || — || October 8, 2008 || Mount Lemmon || Mount Lemmon Survey || — || align=right | 2.4 km || 
|-id=460 bgcolor=#d6d6d6
| 375460 ||  || — || October 8, 2008 || Catalina || CSS || — || align=right | 2.1 km || 
|-id=461 bgcolor=#d6d6d6
| 375461 ||  || — || October 9, 2008 || Mount Lemmon || Mount Lemmon Survey || — || align=right | 2.5 km || 
|-id=462 bgcolor=#d6d6d6
| 375462 ||  || — || October 9, 2008 || Mount Lemmon || Mount Lemmon Survey || — || align=right | 2.5 km || 
|-id=463 bgcolor=#d6d6d6
| 375463 ||  || — || October 9, 2008 || Mount Lemmon || Mount Lemmon Survey || — || align=right | 3.2 km || 
|-id=464 bgcolor=#d6d6d6
| 375464 ||  || — || October 1, 2008 || Mount Lemmon || Mount Lemmon Survey || — || align=right | 3.5 km || 
|-id=465 bgcolor=#d6d6d6
| 375465 ||  || — || October 2, 2008 || Mount Lemmon || Mount Lemmon Survey || — || align=right | 2.9 km || 
|-id=466 bgcolor=#d6d6d6
| 375466 ||  || — || October 6, 2008 || Catalina || CSS || — || align=right | 4.6 km || 
|-id=467 bgcolor=#d6d6d6
| 375467 ||  || — || October 7, 2008 || Kitt Peak || Spacewatch || HYG || align=right | 2.9 km || 
|-id=468 bgcolor=#d6d6d6
| 375468 ||  || — || October 8, 2008 || Kitt Peak || Spacewatch || — || align=right | 3.1 km || 
|-id=469 bgcolor=#d6d6d6
| 375469 ||  || — || October 1, 2008 || Catalina || CSS || — || align=right | 4.1 km || 
|-id=470 bgcolor=#d6d6d6
| 375470 ||  || — || October 3, 2008 || Socorro || LINEAR || — || align=right | 3.8 km || 
|-id=471 bgcolor=#d6d6d6
| 375471 ||  || — || October 7, 2008 || Mount Lemmon || Mount Lemmon Survey || JLI || align=right | 4.1 km || 
|-id=472 bgcolor=#d6d6d6
| 375472 ||  || — || October 9, 2008 || Kitt Peak || Spacewatch || — || align=right | 2.4 km || 
|-id=473 bgcolor=#d6d6d6
| 375473 ||  || — || October 21, 2008 || Great Shefford || P. Birtwhistle || EOS || align=right | 2.2 km || 
|-id=474 bgcolor=#d6d6d6
| 375474 ||  || — || October 17, 2008 || Kitt Peak || Spacewatch || KOR || align=right | 1.4 km || 
|-id=475 bgcolor=#d6d6d6
| 375475 ||  || — || October 17, 2008 || Kitt Peak || Spacewatch || KOR || align=right | 1.8 km || 
|-id=476 bgcolor=#d6d6d6
| 375476 ||  || — || October 18, 2008 || Kitt Peak || Spacewatch || URS || align=right | 4.4 km || 
|-id=477 bgcolor=#d6d6d6
| 375477 ||  || — || September 20, 2008 || Kitt Peak || Spacewatch || — || align=right | 3.0 km || 
|-id=478 bgcolor=#d6d6d6
| 375478 ||  || — || October 19, 2008 || Kitt Peak || Spacewatch || — || align=right | 3.6 km || 
|-id=479 bgcolor=#d6d6d6
| 375479 ||  || — || October 20, 2008 || Mount Lemmon || Mount Lemmon Survey || CHA || align=right | 1.8 km || 
|-id=480 bgcolor=#d6d6d6
| 375480 ||  || — || October 20, 2008 || Kitt Peak || Spacewatch || MEL || align=right | 3.6 km || 
|-id=481 bgcolor=#d6d6d6
| 375481 ||  || — || October 20, 2008 || Kitt Peak || Spacewatch || — || align=right | 3.6 km || 
|-id=482 bgcolor=#E9E9E9
| 375482 ||  || — || October 20, 2008 || Kitt Peak || Spacewatch || — || align=right | 2.3 km || 
|-id=483 bgcolor=#d6d6d6
| 375483 ||  || — || September 26, 2008 || Kitt Peak || Spacewatch || — || align=right | 3.6 km || 
|-id=484 bgcolor=#d6d6d6
| 375484 ||  || — || October 20, 2008 || Kitt Peak || Spacewatch || — || align=right | 2.8 km || 
|-id=485 bgcolor=#d6d6d6
| 375485 ||  || — || December 25, 2003 || Kitt Peak || Spacewatch || — || align=right | 3.3 km || 
|-id=486 bgcolor=#d6d6d6
| 375486 ||  || — || October 20, 2008 || Kitt Peak || Spacewatch || — || align=right | 2.8 km || 
|-id=487 bgcolor=#d6d6d6
| 375487 ||  || — || October 20, 2008 || Kitt Peak || Spacewatch || BRA || align=right | 1.7 km || 
|-id=488 bgcolor=#d6d6d6
| 375488 ||  || — || October 20, 2008 || Kitt Peak || Spacewatch || HYG || align=right | 2.8 km || 
|-id=489 bgcolor=#d6d6d6
| 375489 ||  || — || October 20, 2008 || Kitt Peak || Spacewatch || — || align=right | 3.8 km || 
|-id=490 bgcolor=#d6d6d6
| 375490 ||  || — || October 20, 2008 || Kitt Peak || Spacewatch || — || align=right | 3.6 km || 
|-id=491 bgcolor=#fefefe
| 375491 ||  || — || October 20, 2008 || Mount Lemmon || Mount Lemmon Survey || H || align=right data-sort-value="0.85" | 850 m || 
|-id=492 bgcolor=#d6d6d6
| 375492 ||  || — || October 20, 2008 || Kitt Peak || Spacewatch || EOS || align=right | 2.3 km || 
|-id=493 bgcolor=#d6d6d6
| 375493 ||  || — || October 21, 2008 || Kitt Peak || Spacewatch || — || align=right | 2.5 km || 
|-id=494 bgcolor=#d6d6d6
| 375494 ||  || — || October 21, 2008 || Mount Lemmon || Mount Lemmon Survey || — || align=right | 2.2 km || 
|-id=495 bgcolor=#d6d6d6
| 375495 ||  || — || October 21, 2008 || Kitt Peak || Spacewatch || — || align=right | 3.4 km || 
|-id=496 bgcolor=#d6d6d6
| 375496 ||  || — || October 21, 2008 || Kitt Peak || Spacewatch || — || align=right | 4.1 km || 
|-id=497 bgcolor=#d6d6d6
| 375497 ||  || — || October 21, 2008 || Mount Lemmon || Mount Lemmon Survey || — || align=right | 4.7 km || 
|-id=498 bgcolor=#d6d6d6
| 375498 ||  || — || October 21, 2008 || Mount Lemmon || Mount Lemmon Survey || — || align=right | 4.0 km || 
|-id=499 bgcolor=#d6d6d6
| 375499 ||  || — || October 21, 2008 || Kitt Peak || Spacewatch || — || align=right | 4.0 km || 
|-id=500 bgcolor=#d6d6d6
| 375500 ||  || — || October 21, 2008 || Kitt Peak || Spacewatch || — || align=right | 3.0 km || 
|}

375501–375600 

|-bgcolor=#d6d6d6
| 375501 ||  || — || October 21, 2008 || Kitt Peak || Spacewatch || — || align=right | 3.5 km || 
|-id=502 bgcolor=#d6d6d6
| 375502 ||  || — || October 21, 2008 || Kitt Peak || Spacewatch || LIX || align=right | 4.2 km || 
|-id=503 bgcolor=#d6d6d6
| 375503 ||  || — || October 21, 2008 || Kitt Peak || Spacewatch || EUP || align=right | 7.5 km || 
|-id=504 bgcolor=#d6d6d6
| 375504 ||  || — || October 23, 2008 || Kitt Peak || Spacewatch || URS || align=right | 2.8 km || 
|-id=505 bgcolor=#FFC2E0
| 375505 ||  || — || October 27, 2008 || Catalina || CSS || AMO || align=right data-sort-value="0.34" | 340 m || 
|-id=506 bgcolor=#d6d6d6
| 375506 ||  || — || October 29, 2008 || Socorro || LINEAR || — || align=right | 4.7 km || 
|-id=507 bgcolor=#d6d6d6
| 375507 ||  || — || October 20, 2008 || Kitt Peak || Spacewatch || — || align=right | 2.3 km || 
|-id=508 bgcolor=#d6d6d6
| 375508 ||  || — || October 20, 2008 || Mount Lemmon || Mount Lemmon Survey || — || align=right | 3.0 km || 
|-id=509 bgcolor=#d6d6d6
| 375509 ||  || — || October 22, 2008 || Kitt Peak || Spacewatch || — || align=right | 4.1 km || 
|-id=510 bgcolor=#d6d6d6
| 375510 ||  || — || October 22, 2008 || Kitt Peak || Spacewatch || — || align=right | 4.0 km || 
|-id=511 bgcolor=#d6d6d6
| 375511 ||  || — || October 22, 2008 || Kitt Peak || Spacewatch || — || align=right | 3.3 km || 
|-id=512 bgcolor=#d6d6d6
| 375512 ||  || — || October 22, 2008 || Kitt Peak || Spacewatch || — || align=right | 3.9 km || 
|-id=513 bgcolor=#d6d6d6
| 375513 ||  || — || October 9, 2008 || Kitt Peak || Spacewatch || — || align=right | 3.6 km || 
|-id=514 bgcolor=#d6d6d6
| 375514 ||  || — || October 22, 2008 || Kitt Peak || Spacewatch || — || align=right | 2.6 km || 
|-id=515 bgcolor=#d6d6d6
| 375515 ||  || — || October 22, 2008 || Kitt Peak || Spacewatch || — || align=right | 4.3 km || 
|-id=516 bgcolor=#d6d6d6
| 375516 ||  || — || October 22, 2008 || Kitt Peak || Spacewatch || EOS || align=right | 2.1 km || 
|-id=517 bgcolor=#d6d6d6
| 375517 ||  || — || October 22, 2008 || Kitt Peak || Spacewatch || — || align=right | 4.9 km || 
|-id=518 bgcolor=#d6d6d6
| 375518 ||  || — || October 10, 2008 || Mount Lemmon || Mount Lemmon Survey || — || align=right | 3.2 km || 
|-id=519 bgcolor=#d6d6d6
| 375519 ||  || — || October 23, 2008 || Kitt Peak || Spacewatch || — || align=right | 2.7 km || 
|-id=520 bgcolor=#d6d6d6
| 375520 ||  || — || October 23, 2008 || Kitt Peak || Spacewatch || THM || align=right | 3.0 km || 
|-id=521 bgcolor=#d6d6d6
| 375521 ||  || — || October 23, 2008 || Kitt Peak || Spacewatch || — || align=right | 3.9 km || 
|-id=522 bgcolor=#d6d6d6
| 375522 ||  || — || October 23, 2008 || Kitt Peak || Spacewatch || — || align=right | 2.8 km || 
|-id=523 bgcolor=#d6d6d6
| 375523 ||  || — || October 23, 2008 || Kitt Peak || Spacewatch || — || align=right | 3.7 km || 
|-id=524 bgcolor=#d6d6d6
| 375524 ||  || — || October 23, 2008 || Mount Lemmon || Mount Lemmon Survey || EOS || align=right | 2.1 km || 
|-id=525 bgcolor=#d6d6d6
| 375525 ||  || — || October 23, 2008 || Mount Lemmon || Mount Lemmon Survey || EOS || align=right | 1.6 km || 
|-id=526 bgcolor=#d6d6d6
| 375526 ||  || — || October 23, 2008 || Kitt Peak || Spacewatch || — || align=right | 2.4 km || 
|-id=527 bgcolor=#d6d6d6
| 375527 ||  || — || October 23, 2008 || Kitt Peak || Spacewatch || HYG || align=right | 3.4 km || 
|-id=528 bgcolor=#d6d6d6
| 375528 ||  || — || October 24, 2008 || Kitt Peak || Spacewatch || EOS || align=right | 2.0 km || 
|-id=529 bgcolor=#d6d6d6
| 375529 ||  || — || October 24, 2008 || Kitt Peak || Spacewatch || — || align=right | 3.0 km || 
|-id=530 bgcolor=#d6d6d6
| 375530 ||  || — || October 24, 2008 || Mount Lemmon || Mount Lemmon Survey || — || align=right | 3.4 km || 
|-id=531 bgcolor=#d6d6d6
| 375531 ||  || — || October 24, 2008 || Mount Lemmon || Mount Lemmon Survey || — || align=right | 5.0 km || 
|-id=532 bgcolor=#d6d6d6
| 375532 ||  || — || October 24, 2008 || Kitt Peak || Spacewatch || — || align=right | 3.0 km || 
|-id=533 bgcolor=#d6d6d6
| 375533 ||  || — || October 24, 2008 || Kitt Peak || Spacewatch || — || align=right | 3.4 km || 
|-id=534 bgcolor=#d6d6d6
| 375534 ||  || — || October 24, 2008 || Kitt Peak || Spacewatch || — || align=right | 2.6 km || 
|-id=535 bgcolor=#fefefe
| 375535 ||  || — || October 24, 2008 || Kitt Peak || Spacewatch || H || align=right data-sort-value="0.60" | 600 m || 
|-id=536 bgcolor=#d6d6d6
| 375536 ||  || — || October 24, 2008 || Kitt Peak || Spacewatch || HYG || align=right | 3.0 km || 
|-id=537 bgcolor=#d6d6d6
| 375537 ||  || — || October 25, 2008 || Mount Lemmon || Mount Lemmon Survey || — || align=right | 4.4 km || 
|-id=538 bgcolor=#d6d6d6
| 375538 ||  || — || October 28, 2008 || Socorro || LINEAR || — || align=right | 3.5 km || 
|-id=539 bgcolor=#d6d6d6
| 375539 ||  || — || October 28, 2008 || Socorro || LINEAR || — || align=right | 3.8 km || 
|-id=540 bgcolor=#d6d6d6
| 375540 ||  || — || October 22, 2008 || Siding Spring || SSS || ALA || align=right | 3.6 km || 
|-id=541 bgcolor=#d6d6d6
| 375541 ||  || — || October 24, 2008 || Catalina || CSS || — || align=right | 3.5 km || 
|-id=542 bgcolor=#d6d6d6
| 375542 ||  || — || October 24, 2008 || Catalina || CSS || — || align=right | 3.1 km || 
|-id=543 bgcolor=#d6d6d6
| 375543 ||  || — || October 24, 2008 || Kitt Peak || Spacewatch || — || align=right | 2.6 km || 
|-id=544 bgcolor=#d6d6d6
| 375544 ||  || — || October 25, 2008 || Kitt Peak || Spacewatch || — || align=right | 5.1 km || 
|-id=545 bgcolor=#d6d6d6
| 375545 ||  || — || October 26, 2008 || Kitt Peak || Spacewatch || — || align=right | 2.1 km || 
|-id=546 bgcolor=#d6d6d6
| 375546 ||  || — || October 27, 2008 || Kitt Peak || Spacewatch || THM || align=right | 2.1 km || 
|-id=547 bgcolor=#d6d6d6
| 375547 ||  || — || October 27, 2008 || Kitt Peak || Spacewatch || THM || align=right | 2.6 km || 
|-id=548 bgcolor=#d6d6d6
| 375548 ||  || — || October 27, 2008 || Kitt Peak || Spacewatch || EOS || align=right | 2.0 km || 
|-id=549 bgcolor=#d6d6d6
| 375549 ||  || — || October 28, 2008 || Kitt Peak || Spacewatch || — || align=right | 4.4 km || 
|-id=550 bgcolor=#d6d6d6
| 375550 ||  || — || October 20, 2008 || Kitt Peak || Spacewatch || — || align=right | 4.3 km || 
|-id=551 bgcolor=#d6d6d6
| 375551 ||  || — || October 28, 2008 || Kitt Peak || Spacewatch || — || align=right | 3.8 km || 
|-id=552 bgcolor=#d6d6d6
| 375552 ||  || — || October 28, 2008 || Mount Lemmon || Mount Lemmon Survey || — || align=right | 4.3 km || 
|-id=553 bgcolor=#d6d6d6
| 375553 ||  || — || October 29, 2008 || Kitt Peak || Spacewatch || — || align=right | 3.2 km || 
|-id=554 bgcolor=#d6d6d6
| 375554 ||  || — || September 30, 2003 || Kitt Peak || Spacewatch || — || align=right | 2.7 km || 
|-id=555 bgcolor=#d6d6d6
| 375555 ||  || — || October 8, 2008 || Mount Lemmon || Mount Lemmon Survey || EOS || align=right | 2.3 km || 
|-id=556 bgcolor=#d6d6d6
| 375556 ||  || — || October 30, 2008 || Catalina || CSS || EUP || align=right | 4.3 km || 
|-id=557 bgcolor=#d6d6d6
| 375557 ||  || — || September 4, 2008 || Socorro || LINEAR || INA || align=right | 3.4 km || 
|-id=558 bgcolor=#d6d6d6
| 375558 ||  || — || October 30, 2008 || Kitt Peak || Spacewatch || EOS || align=right | 2.5 km || 
|-id=559 bgcolor=#d6d6d6
| 375559 ||  || — || October 30, 2008 || Kitt Peak || Spacewatch || — || align=right | 2.5 km || 
|-id=560 bgcolor=#d6d6d6
| 375560 ||  || — || October 17, 2003 || Kitt Peak || Spacewatch || — || align=right | 3.3 km || 
|-id=561 bgcolor=#d6d6d6
| 375561 ||  || — || October 30, 2008 || Kitt Peak || Spacewatch || THM || align=right | 2.2 km || 
|-id=562 bgcolor=#d6d6d6
| 375562 ||  || — || September 23, 2008 || Kitt Peak || Spacewatch || HYG || align=right | 2.5 km || 
|-id=563 bgcolor=#d6d6d6
| 375563 ||  || — || October 31, 2008 || Mount Lemmon || Mount Lemmon Survey || — || align=right | 2.6 km || 
|-id=564 bgcolor=#d6d6d6
| 375564 ||  || — || October 31, 2008 || Catalina || CSS || EOS || align=right | 2.2 km || 
|-id=565 bgcolor=#d6d6d6
| 375565 ||  || — || October 30, 2008 || Catalina || CSS || EMA || align=right | 4.7 km || 
|-id=566 bgcolor=#d6d6d6
| 375566 ||  || — || October 31, 2008 || Kitt Peak || Spacewatch || — || align=right | 3.8 km || 
|-id=567 bgcolor=#d6d6d6
| 375567 ||  || — || October 31, 2008 || Mount Lemmon || Mount Lemmon Survey || — || align=right | 3.3 km || 
|-id=568 bgcolor=#d6d6d6
| 375568 ||  || — || October 20, 2008 || Kitt Peak || Spacewatch || — || align=right | 3.6 km || 
|-id=569 bgcolor=#d6d6d6
| 375569 ||  || — || October 3, 2008 || Mount Lemmon || Mount Lemmon Survey || TIR || align=right | 3.8 km || 
|-id=570 bgcolor=#d6d6d6
| 375570 ||  || — || October 20, 2008 || Kitt Peak || Spacewatch || HYG || align=right | 2.8 km || 
|-id=571 bgcolor=#d6d6d6
| 375571 ||  || — || October 20, 2008 || Kitt Peak || Spacewatch || KOR || align=right | 1.5 km || 
|-id=572 bgcolor=#d6d6d6
| 375572 ||  || — || October 20, 2008 || Kitt Peak || Spacewatch || — || align=right | 3.0 km || 
|-id=573 bgcolor=#d6d6d6
| 375573 ||  || — || October 30, 2008 || Catalina || CSS || — || align=right | 3.4 km || 
|-id=574 bgcolor=#d6d6d6
| 375574 ||  || — || October 24, 2008 || Kitt Peak || Spacewatch || HYG || align=right | 2.6 km || 
|-id=575 bgcolor=#d6d6d6
| 375575 ||  || — || October 27, 2008 || Mount Lemmon || Mount Lemmon Survey || HYG || align=right | 2.9 km || 
|-id=576 bgcolor=#d6d6d6
| 375576 ||  || — || October 28, 2008 || Mount Lemmon || Mount Lemmon Survey || — || align=right | 2.6 km || 
|-id=577 bgcolor=#d6d6d6
| 375577 ||  || — || October 23, 2008 || Kitt Peak || Spacewatch || — || align=right | 2.7 km || 
|-id=578 bgcolor=#d6d6d6
| 375578 ||  || — || October 27, 2008 || Mount Lemmon || Mount Lemmon Survey || — || align=right | 3.3 km || 
|-id=579 bgcolor=#d6d6d6
| 375579 ||  || — || October 26, 2008 || Mount Lemmon || Mount Lemmon Survey || — || align=right | 5.0 km || 
|-id=580 bgcolor=#d6d6d6
| 375580 ||  || — || October 25, 2008 || Catalina || CSS || — || align=right | 4.6 km || 
|-id=581 bgcolor=#d6d6d6
| 375581 ||  || — || October 30, 2008 || Kitt Peak || Spacewatch || VER || align=right | 4.3 km || 
|-id=582 bgcolor=#d6d6d6
| 375582 ||  || — || October 29, 2008 || Socorro || LINEAR || JLI || align=right | 4.0 km || 
|-id=583 bgcolor=#d6d6d6
| 375583 ||  || — || November 2, 2008 || Socorro || LINEAR || — || align=right | 3.9 km || 
|-id=584 bgcolor=#d6d6d6
| 375584 ||  || — || October 21, 2008 || Mount Lemmon || Mount Lemmon Survey || URS || align=right | 4.8 km || 
|-id=585 bgcolor=#d6d6d6
| 375585 ||  || — || November 2, 2008 || Mount Lemmon || Mount Lemmon Survey || — || align=right | 3.1 km || 
|-id=586 bgcolor=#d6d6d6
| 375586 ||  || — || November 2, 2008 || Mount Lemmon || Mount Lemmon Survey || — || align=right | 4.3 km || 
|-id=587 bgcolor=#d6d6d6
| 375587 ||  || — || November 1, 2008 || Kitt Peak || Spacewatch || — || align=right | 2.5 km || 
|-id=588 bgcolor=#d6d6d6
| 375588 ||  || — || November 1, 2008 || Catalina || CSS || EUP || align=right | 5.6 km || 
|-id=589 bgcolor=#d6d6d6
| 375589 ||  || — || November 1, 2008 || Mount Lemmon || Mount Lemmon Survey || — || align=right | 2.2 km || 
|-id=590 bgcolor=#d6d6d6
| 375590 ||  || — || November 2, 2008 || Kitt Peak || Spacewatch || — || align=right | 3.1 km || 
|-id=591 bgcolor=#d6d6d6
| 375591 ||  || — || November 2, 2008 || Kitt Peak || Spacewatch || EOS || align=right | 1.9 km || 
|-id=592 bgcolor=#d6d6d6
| 375592 ||  || — || September 24, 2008 || Mount Lemmon || Mount Lemmon Survey || — || align=right | 3.4 km || 
|-id=593 bgcolor=#d6d6d6
| 375593 ||  || — || November 2, 2008 || Kitt Peak || Spacewatch || — || align=right | 4.1 km || 
|-id=594 bgcolor=#d6d6d6
| 375594 ||  || — || October 21, 2008 || Kitt Peak || Spacewatch || — || align=right | 3.7 km || 
|-id=595 bgcolor=#d6d6d6
| 375595 ||  || — || November 3, 2008 || Kitt Peak || Spacewatch || THM || align=right | 1.7 km || 
|-id=596 bgcolor=#d6d6d6
| 375596 ||  || — || November 7, 2008 || Kitt Peak || Spacewatch || VER || align=right | 2.9 km || 
|-id=597 bgcolor=#d6d6d6
| 375597 ||  || — || November 8, 2008 || Mount Lemmon || Mount Lemmon Survey || CHA || align=right | 2.1 km || 
|-id=598 bgcolor=#d6d6d6
| 375598 ||  || — || November 7, 2008 || Mount Lemmon || Mount Lemmon Survey || — || align=right | 2.7 km || 
|-id=599 bgcolor=#d6d6d6
| 375599 ||  || — || November 2, 2008 || Mount Lemmon || Mount Lemmon Survey || VER || align=right | 3.7 km || 
|-id=600 bgcolor=#d6d6d6
| 375600 ||  || — || November 2, 2008 || Mount Lemmon || Mount Lemmon Survey || VER || align=right | 4.3 km || 
|}

375601–375700 

|-bgcolor=#d6d6d6
| 375601 ||  || — || November 8, 2008 || Kitt Peak || Spacewatch || — || align=right | 2.7 km || 
|-id=602 bgcolor=#d6d6d6
| 375602 ||  || — || November 17, 2008 || Kitt Peak || Spacewatch || — || align=right | 2.3 km || 
|-id=603 bgcolor=#d6d6d6
| 375603 ||  || — || October 28, 2008 || Kitt Peak || Spacewatch || VER || align=right | 3.1 km || 
|-id=604 bgcolor=#d6d6d6
| 375604 ||  || — || November 18, 2008 || Catalina || CSS || HYG || align=right | 2.5 km || 
|-id=605 bgcolor=#E9E9E9
| 375605 ||  || — || October 27, 2008 || Mount Lemmon || Mount Lemmon Survey || — || align=right | 3.0 km || 
|-id=606 bgcolor=#d6d6d6
| 375606 ||  || — || November 17, 2008 || Kitt Peak || Spacewatch || THM || align=right | 2.7 km || 
|-id=607 bgcolor=#d6d6d6
| 375607 ||  || — || November 18, 2008 || Kitt Peak || Spacewatch || — || align=right | 2.9 km || 
|-id=608 bgcolor=#d6d6d6
| 375608 ||  || — || November 18, 2008 || Catalina || CSS || — || align=right | 3.5 km || 
|-id=609 bgcolor=#d6d6d6
| 375609 ||  || — || November 17, 2008 || Kitt Peak || Spacewatch || HYG || align=right | 3.5 km || 
|-id=610 bgcolor=#d6d6d6
| 375610 ||  || — || November 17, 2008 || Kitt Peak || Spacewatch || — || align=right | 2.2 km || 
|-id=611 bgcolor=#d6d6d6
| 375611 ||  || — || November 17, 2008 || Kitt Peak || Spacewatch || — || align=right | 2.7 km || 
|-id=612 bgcolor=#d6d6d6
| 375612 ||  || — || November 17, 2008 || Kitt Peak || Spacewatch || — || align=right | 2.9 km || 
|-id=613 bgcolor=#d6d6d6
| 375613 ||  || — || November 17, 2008 || Kitt Peak || Spacewatch || — || align=right | 2.7 km || 
|-id=614 bgcolor=#d6d6d6
| 375614 ||  || — || November 17, 2008 || Kitt Peak || Spacewatch || THM || align=right | 2.5 km || 
|-id=615 bgcolor=#d6d6d6
| 375615 ||  || — || November 17, 2008 || Kitt Peak || Spacewatch || — || align=right | 4.2 km || 
|-id=616 bgcolor=#d6d6d6
| 375616 ||  || — || November 17, 2008 || Kitt Peak || Spacewatch || HYG || align=right | 3.5 km || 
|-id=617 bgcolor=#d6d6d6
| 375617 ||  || — || November 19, 2008 || Socorro || LINEAR || — || align=right | 3.7 km || 
|-id=618 bgcolor=#d6d6d6
| 375618 ||  || — || November 20, 2008 || Kitt Peak || Spacewatch || — || align=right | 2.8 km || 
|-id=619 bgcolor=#d6d6d6
| 375619 ||  || — || November 20, 2008 || Kitt Peak || Spacewatch || — || align=right | 3.0 km || 
|-id=620 bgcolor=#d6d6d6
| 375620 ||  || — || November 21, 2008 || Mount Lemmon || Mount Lemmon Survey || — || align=right | 2.5 km || 
|-id=621 bgcolor=#fefefe
| 375621 ||  || — || November 17, 2008 || Catalina || CSS || H || align=right data-sort-value="0.94" | 940 m || 
|-id=622 bgcolor=#d6d6d6
| 375622 ||  || — || September 28, 2008 || Mount Lemmon || Mount Lemmon Survey || — || align=right | 3.9 km || 
|-id=623 bgcolor=#d6d6d6
| 375623 ||  || — || November 2, 2008 || Catalina || CSS || EOS || align=right | 2.4 km || 
|-id=624 bgcolor=#d6d6d6
| 375624 ||  || — || November 30, 2008 || Kitt Peak || Spacewatch || — || align=right | 4.0 km || 
|-id=625 bgcolor=#d6d6d6
| 375625 ||  || — || February 12, 2004 || Kitt Peak || Spacewatch || — || align=right | 2.8 km || 
|-id=626 bgcolor=#d6d6d6
| 375626 ||  || — || November 29, 2008 || Bergisch Gladbac || W. Bickel || — || align=right | 4.2 km || 
|-id=627 bgcolor=#d6d6d6
| 375627 ||  || — || November 6, 2008 || Mount Lemmon || Mount Lemmon Survey || — || align=right | 3.0 km || 
|-id=628 bgcolor=#d6d6d6
| 375628 ||  || — || November 21, 2008 || Kitt Peak || Spacewatch || — || align=right | 5.4 km || 
|-id=629 bgcolor=#d6d6d6
| 375629 ||  || — || November 29, 1997 || Kitt Peak || Spacewatch || — || align=right | 3.0 km || 
|-id=630 bgcolor=#d6d6d6
| 375630 ||  || — || October 20, 2008 || Kitt Peak || Spacewatch || — || align=right | 3.5 km || 
|-id=631 bgcolor=#d6d6d6
| 375631 ||  || — || December 1, 2008 || Kitt Peak || Spacewatch || — || align=right | 2.6 km || 
|-id=632 bgcolor=#d6d6d6
| 375632 ||  || — || December 1, 2008 || Kitt Peak || Spacewatch || — || align=right | 6.5 km || 
|-id=633 bgcolor=#d6d6d6
| 375633 ||  || — || December 1, 2008 || Kitt Peak || Spacewatch || — || align=right | 3.2 km || 
|-id=634 bgcolor=#d6d6d6
| 375634 ||  || — || December 5, 2008 || Catalina || CSS || — || align=right | 8.1 km || 
|-id=635 bgcolor=#d6d6d6
| 375635 ||  || — || December 4, 2008 || Mount Lemmon || Mount Lemmon Survey || THM || align=right | 2.4 km || 
|-id=636 bgcolor=#d6d6d6
| 375636 ||  || — || December 5, 2008 || Mount Lemmon || Mount Lemmon Survey || TIR || align=right | 3.0 km || 
|-id=637 bgcolor=#d6d6d6
| 375637 ||  || — || December 22, 2008 || Piszkéstető || K. Sárneczky || — || align=right | 5.9 km || 
|-id=638 bgcolor=#d6d6d6
| 375638 ||  || — || December 21, 2008 || Mount Lemmon || Mount Lemmon Survey || THM || align=right | 2.3 km || 
|-id=639 bgcolor=#d6d6d6
| 375639 ||  || — || December 28, 2008 || Taunus || S. Karge, R. Kling || HYG || align=right | 3.0 km || 
|-id=640 bgcolor=#d6d6d6
| 375640 ||  || — || December 29, 2008 || Kitt Peak || Spacewatch || 637 || align=right | 3.3 km || 
|-id=641 bgcolor=#fefefe
| 375641 ||  || — || December 29, 2008 || Catalina || CSS || H || align=right data-sort-value="0.98" | 980 m || 
|-id=642 bgcolor=#d6d6d6
| 375642 ||  || — || December 31, 2008 || Mount Lemmon || Mount Lemmon Survey || — || align=right | 3.7 km || 
|-id=643 bgcolor=#d6d6d6
| 375643 ||  || — || March 15, 2004 || Kitt Peak || Spacewatch || THM || align=right | 1.8 km || 
|-id=644 bgcolor=#d6d6d6
| 375644 ||  || — || October 30, 2007 || Mount Lemmon || Mount Lemmon Survey || 7:4 || align=right | 3.1 km || 
|-id=645 bgcolor=#d6d6d6
| 375645 ||  || — || December 31, 2008 || Kitt Peak || Spacewatch || — || align=right | 2.1 km || 
|-id=646 bgcolor=#d6d6d6
| 375646 ||  || — || December 30, 2008 || Purple Mountain || PMO NEO || — || align=right | 4.6 km || 
|-id=647 bgcolor=#d6d6d6
| 375647 ||  || — || December 22, 2008 || Catalina || CSS || — || align=right | 3.8 km || 
|-id=648 bgcolor=#d6d6d6
| 375648 || 2009 AX || — || January 1, 2009 || Kachina || J. Hobart || — || align=right | 3.4 km || 
|-id=649 bgcolor=#d6d6d6
| 375649 ||  || — || January 16, 2009 || Dauban || F. Kugel || — || align=right | 2.6 km || 
|-id=650 bgcolor=#d6d6d6
| 375650 ||  || — || January 16, 2009 || Mount Lemmon || Mount Lemmon Survey || THM || align=right | 2.6 km || 
|-id=651 bgcolor=#d6d6d6
| 375651 ||  || — || August 29, 2005 || Kitt Peak || Spacewatch || 3:2 || align=right | 4.3 km || 
|-id=652 bgcolor=#d6d6d6
| 375652 ||  || — || January 16, 2009 || Kitt Peak || Spacewatch || — || align=right | 2.8 km || 
|-id=653 bgcolor=#d6d6d6
| 375653 ||  || — || January 16, 2009 || La Sagra || OAM Obs. || 7:4 || align=right | 4.8 km || 
|-id=654 bgcolor=#d6d6d6
| 375654 ||  || — || January 26, 2009 || Mount Lemmon || Mount Lemmon Survey || — || align=right | 2.4 km || 
|-id=655 bgcolor=#d6d6d6
| 375655 ||  || — || March 11, 2003 || Kitt Peak || Spacewatch || 7:4 || align=right | 4.6 km || 
|-id=656 bgcolor=#fefefe
| 375656 ||  || — || January 31, 2009 || Mount Lemmon || Mount Lemmon Survey || — || align=right data-sort-value="0.76" | 760 m || 
|-id=657 bgcolor=#FFC2E0
| 375657 ||  || — || February 14, 2009 || Catalina || CSS || APOcritical || align=right data-sort-value="0.18" | 180 m || 
|-id=658 bgcolor=#fefefe
| 375658 ||  || — || February 1, 2009 || Kitt Peak || Spacewatch || — || align=right data-sort-value="0.57" | 570 m || 
|-id=659 bgcolor=#d6d6d6
| 375659 ||  || — || February 2, 2009 || Kitt Peak || Spacewatch || 7:4 || align=right | 3.3 km || 
|-id=660 bgcolor=#fefefe
| 375660 ||  || — || January 30, 2009 || Catalina || CSS || H || align=right data-sort-value="0.98" | 980 m || 
|-id=661 bgcolor=#d6d6d6
| 375661 ||  || — || February 19, 2009 || Mount Lemmon || Mount Lemmon Survey || — || align=right | 4.1 km || 
|-id=662 bgcolor=#fefefe
| 375662 ||  || — || February 20, 2009 || Catalina || CSS || H || align=right data-sort-value="0.63" | 630 m || 
|-id=663 bgcolor=#fefefe
| 375663 ||  || — || February 19, 2009 || Catalina || CSS || H || align=right data-sort-value="0.69" | 690 m || 
|-id=664 bgcolor=#d6d6d6
| 375664 ||  || — || February 21, 2009 || Kitt Peak || Spacewatch || SHU3:2 || align=right | 5.0 km || 
|-id=665 bgcolor=#d6d6d6
| 375665 ||  || — || February 27, 2009 || Mount Lemmon || Mount Lemmon Survey || SHU3:2 || align=right | 5.6 km || 
|-id=666 bgcolor=#fefefe
| 375666 ||  || — || March 15, 2009 || Kitt Peak || Spacewatch || — || align=right | 1.0 km || 
|-id=667 bgcolor=#fefefe
| 375667 ||  || — || March 1, 2009 || Kitt Peak || Spacewatch || — || align=right data-sort-value="0.72" | 720 m || 
|-id=668 bgcolor=#fefefe
| 375668 ||  || — || March 17, 2009 || Taunus || E. Schwab, R. Kling || H || align=right data-sort-value="0.53" | 530 m || 
|-id=669 bgcolor=#C2FFFF
| 375669 ||  || — || March 26, 2009 || Cerro Burek || Alianza S4 Obs. || L5 || align=right | 12 km || 
|-id=670 bgcolor=#fefefe
| 375670 ||  || — || March 28, 2009 || Kitt Peak || Spacewatch || — || align=right data-sort-value="0.66" | 660 m || 
|-id=671 bgcolor=#fefefe
| 375671 ||  || — || March 29, 2009 || Mount Lemmon || Mount Lemmon Survey || — || align=right data-sort-value="0.84" | 840 m || 
|-id=672 bgcolor=#E9E9E9
| 375672 ||  || — || March 19, 2009 || Calar Alto || F. Hormuth || — || align=right | 1.4 km || 
|-id=673 bgcolor=#fefefe
| 375673 ||  || — || March 25, 2009 || Mount Lemmon || Mount Lemmon Survey || — || align=right data-sort-value="0.83" | 830 m || 
|-id=674 bgcolor=#fefefe
| 375674 ||  || — || March 16, 2009 || Kitt Peak || Spacewatch || FLO || align=right data-sort-value="0.64" | 640 m || 
|-id=675 bgcolor=#fefefe
| 375675 ||  || — || April 17, 2009 || Kitt Peak || Spacewatch || FLO || align=right data-sort-value="0.59" | 590 m || 
|-id=676 bgcolor=#fefefe
| 375676 ||  || — || March 17, 2009 || Kitt Peak || Spacewatch || FLO || align=right data-sort-value="0.64" | 640 m || 
|-id=677 bgcolor=#fefefe
| 375677 ||  || — || April 17, 2009 || Catalina || CSS || H || align=right data-sort-value="0.65" | 650 m || 
|-id=678 bgcolor=#fefefe
| 375678 ||  || — || April 18, 2009 || Kitt Peak || Spacewatch || — || align=right data-sort-value="0.67" | 670 m || 
|-id=679 bgcolor=#fefefe
| 375679 ||  || — || April 17, 2009 || Catalina || CSS || — || align=right data-sort-value="0.85" | 850 m || 
|-id=680 bgcolor=#fefefe
| 375680 ||  || — || April 20, 2009 || Kitt Peak || Spacewatch || FLO || align=right data-sort-value="0.73" | 730 m || 
|-id=681 bgcolor=#fefefe
| 375681 ||  || — || April 20, 2009 || Kitt Peak || Spacewatch || — || align=right data-sort-value="0.69" | 690 m || 
|-id=682 bgcolor=#fefefe
| 375682 ||  || — || April 29, 2009 || Cerro Burek || Alianza S4 Obs. || — || align=right | 1.0 km || 
|-id=683 bgcolor=#fefefe
| 375683 ||  || — || April 21, 2009 || Kitt Peak || Spacewatch || — || align=right data-sort-value="0.72" | 720 m || 
|-id=684 bgcolor=#fefefe
| 375684 ||  || — || April 21, 2002 || Kitt Peak || Spacewatch || NYS || align=right data-sort-value="0.55" | 550 m || 
|-id=685 bgcolor=#fefefe
| 375685 ||  || — || May 2, 2009 || La Sagra || OAM Obs. || — || align=right data-sort-value="0.71" | 710 m || 
|-id=686 bgcolor=#fefefe
| 375686 ||  || — || May 26, 2009 || Catalina || CSS || — || align=right data-sort-value="0.80" | 800 m || 
|-id=687 bgcolor=#fefefe
| 375687 ||  || — || May 29, 2009 || Kitt Peak || Spacewatch || — || align=right data-sort-value="0.95" | 950 m || 
|-id=688 bgcolor=#fefefe
| 375688 ||  || — || May 31, 2009 || Skylive Obs. || F. Tozzi || PHO || align=right | 1.0 km || 
|-id=689 bgcolor=#fefefe
| 375689 ||  || — || October 3, 2006 || Mount Lemmon || Mount Lemmon Survey || ERI || align=right | 1.4 km || 
|-id=690 bgcolor=#fefefe
| 375690 ||  || — || November 30, 2003 || Kitt Peak || Spacewatch || — || align=right data-sort-value="0.88" | 880 m || 
|-id=691 bgcolor=#fefefe
| 375691 ||  || — || June 22, 2009 || Calvin-Rehoboth || Calvin–Rehoboth Obs. || V || align=right data-sort-value="0.80" | 800 m || 
|-id=692 bgcolor=#fefefe
| 375692 ||  || — || June 28, 2009 || La Sagra || OAM Obs. || — || align=right data-sort-value="0.81" | 810 m || 
|-id=693 bgcolor=#fefefe
| 375693 ||  || — || July 14, 2009 || Kitt Peak || Spacewatch || NYS || align=right data-sort-value="0.70" | 700 m || 
|-id=694 bgcolor=#fefefe
| 375694 ||  || — || July 19, 2009 || La Sagra || OAM Obs. || — || align=right data-sort-value="0.78" | 780 m || 
|-id=695 bgcolor=#fefefe
| 375695 ||  || — || June 27, 2009 || Mount Lemmon || Mount Lemmon Survey || NYS || align=right data-sort-value="0.92" | 920 m || 
|-id=696 bgcolor=#fefefe
| 375696 ||  || — || July 19, 2009 || La Sagra || OAM Obs. || — || align=right data-sort-value="0.92" | 920 m || 
|-id=697 bgcolor=#fefefe
| 375697 ||  || — || July 27, 2009 || La Sagra || OAM Obs. || — || align=right data-sort-value="0.95" | 950 m || 
|-id=698 bgcolor=#fefefe
| 375698 ||  || — || July 20, 2009 || Siding Spring || SSS || — || align=right | 1.3 km || 
|-id=699 bgcolor=#fefefe
| 375699 ||  || — || October 22, 2006 || Catalina || CSS || V || align=right data-sort-value="0.93" | 930 m || 
|-id=700 bgcolor=#fefefe
| 375700 ||  || — || August 15, 2009 || Altschwendt || W. Ries || — || align=right data-sort-value="0.99" | 990 m || 
|}

375701–375800 

|-bgcolor=#fefefe
| 375701 ||  || — || September 5, 1994 || La Silla || E. W. Elst || — || align=right data-sort-value="0.71" | 710 m || 
|-id=702 bgcolor=#fefefe
| 375702 ||  || — || August 14, 2009 || La Sagra || OAM Obs. || — || align=right data-sort-value="0.90" | 900 m || 
|-id=703 bgcolor=#fefefe
| 375703 ||  || — || August 15, 2009 || La Sagra || OAM Obs. || — || align=right data-sort-value="0.98" | 980 m || 
|-id=704 bgcolor=#fefefe
| 375704 ||  || — || August 15, 2009 || Kitt Peak || Spacewatch || FLO || align=right data-sort-value="0.68" | 680 m || 
|-id=705 bgcolor=#fefefe
| 375705 ||  || — || August 15, 2009 || Kitt Peak || Spacewatch || PHO || align=right data-sort-value="0.82" | 820 m || 
|-id=706 bgcolor=#fefefe
| 375706 ||  || — || August 15, 2009 || Catalina || CSS || — || align=right data-sort-value="0.79" | 790 m || 
|-id=707 bgcolor=#fefefe
| 375707 ||  || — || August 1, 2009 || Kitt Peak || Spacewatch || NYS || align=right data-sort-value="0.70" | 700 m || 
|-id=708 bgcolor=#fefefe
| 375708 ||  || — || June 23, 2009 || Mount Lemmon || Mount Lemmon Survey || NYS || align=right data-sort-value="0.78" | 780 m || 
|-id=709 bgcolor=#fefefe
| 375709 ||  || — || August 15, 2009 || Kitt Peak || Spacewatch || — || align=right | 1.2 km || 
|-id=710 bgcolor=#fefefe
| 375710 ||  || — || August 15, 2009 || Kitt Peak || Spacewatch || — || align=right data-sort-value="0.83" | 830 m || 
|-id=711 bgcolor=#fefefe
| 375711 ||  || — || August 15, 2009 || Kitt Peak || Spacewatch || — || align=right data-sort-value="0.79" | 790 m || 
|-id=712 bgcolor=#fefefe
| 375712 ||  || — || August 15, 2009 || Kitt Peak || Spacewatch || — || align=right data-sort-value="0.89" | 890 m || 
|-id=713 bgcolor=#fefefe
| 375713 ||  || — || December 5, 2002 || Socorro || LINEAR || — || align=right | 1.3 km || 
|-id=714 bgcolor=#fefefe
| 375714 ||  || — || August 19, 2009 || Skylive Obs. || F. Tozzi || — || align=right | 1.4 km || 
|-id=715 bgcolor=#fefefe
| 375715 ||  || — || August 18, 2009 || La Sagra || OAM Obs. || NYS || align=right data-sort-value="0.80" | 800 m || 
|-id=716 bgcolor=#fefefe
| 375716 ||  || — || August 19, 2009 || La Sagra || OAM Obs. || FLO || align=right data-sort-value="0.81" | 810 m || 
|-id=717 bgcolor=#fefefe
| 375717 ||  || — || August 19, 2009 || La Sagra || OAM Obs. || NYS || align=right data-sort-value="0.74" | 740 m || 
|-id=718 bgcolor=#fefefe
| 375718 ||  || — || August 19, 2009 || La Sagra || OAM Obs. || — || align=right | 1.0 km || 
|-id=719 bgcolor=#fefefe
| 375719 ||  || — || August 19, 2009 || La Sagra || OAM Obs. || — || align=right data-sort-value="0.82" | 820 m || 
|-id=720 bgcolor=#fefefe
| 375720 ||  || — || August 16, 2009 || La Sagra || OAM Obs. || V || align=right data-sort-value="0.74" | 740 m || 
|-id=721 bgcolor=#fefefe
| 375721 ||  || — || August 10, 2009 || Kitt Peak || Spacewatch || — || align=right | 1.0 km || 
|-id=722 bgcolor=#fefefe
| 375722 ||  || — || August 25, 2009 || Plana || F. Fratev || NYS || align=right data-sort-value="0.72" | 720 m || 
|-id=723 bgcolor=#E9E9E9
| 375723 ||  || — || August 29, 2009 || Bergisch Gladbac || W. Bickel || RAF || align=right | 1.1 km || 
|-id=724 bgcolor=#fefefe
| 375724 ||  || — || August 26, 2009 || La Sagra || OAM Obs. || NYS || align=right data-sort-value="0.72" | 720 m || 
|-id=725 bgcolor=#E9E9E9
| 375725 ||  || — || August 15, 2009 || Kitt Peak || Spacewatch || — || align=right | 1.2 km || 
|-id=726 bgcolor=#E9E9E9
| 375726 ||  || — || August 27, 2009 || Catalina || CSS || — || align=right data-sort-value="0.60" | 600 m || 
|-id=727 bgcolor=#fefefe
| 375727 ||  || — || August 28, 2009 || La Sagra || OAM Obs. || — || align=right | 1.1 km || 
|-id=728 bgcolor=#fefefe
| 375728 ||  || — || August 28, 2009 || La Sagra || OAM Obs. || NYS || align=right data-sort-value="0.76" | 760 m || 
|-id=729 bgcolor=#fefefe
| 375729 ||  || — || August 16, 2009 || La Sagra || OAM Obs. || — || align=right | 1.3 km || 
|-id=730 bgcolor=#E9E9E9
| 375730 ||  || — || August 28, 2009 || Kitt Peak || Spacewatch || — || align=right | 3.3 km || 
|-id=731 bgcolor=#fefefe
| 375731 ||  || — || September 12, 2009 || Kitt Peak || Spacewatch || NYS || align=right data-sort-value="0.70" | 700 m || 
|-id=732 bgcolor=#fefefe
| 375732 ||  || — || September 12, 2009 || Kitt Peak || Spacewatch || — || align=right data-sort-value="0.88" | 880 m || 
|-id=733 bgcolor=#E9E9E9
| 375733 ||  || — || September 14, 2009 || Kitt Peak || Spacewatch || — || align=right | 1.3 km || 
|-id=734 bgcolor=#E9E9E9
| 375734 ||  || — || September 14, 2009 || Kitt Peak || Spacewatch || — || align=right | 1.4 km || 
|-id=735 bgcolor=#E9E9E9
| 375735 ||  || — || September 14, 2009 || Kitt Peak || Spacewatch || — || align=right | 1.7 km || 
|-id=736 bgcolor=#fefefe
| 375736 ||  || — || September 15, 2009 || Kitt Peak || Spacewatch || — || align=right data-sort-value="0.89" | 890 m || 
|-id=737 bgcolor=#E9E9E9
| 375737 ||  || — || September 15, 2009 || Kitt Peak || Spacewatch || — || align=right data-sort-value="0.89" | 890 m || 
|-id=738 bgcolor=#E9E9E9
| 375738 ||  || — || September 15, 2009 || Kitt Peak || Spacewatch || MIS || align=right | 1.7 km || 
|-id=739 bgcolor=#E9E9E9
| 375739 ||  || — || November 18, 2001 || Kitt Peak || Spacewatch || — || align=right data-sort-value="0.94" | 940 m || 
|-id=740 bgcolor=#E9E9E9
| 375740 ||  || — || September 15, 2009 || Kitt Peak || Spacewatch || — || align=right | 1.7 km || 
|-id=741 bgcolor=#E9E9E9
| 375741 ||  || — || September 14, 2009 || Kitt Peak || Spacewatch || — || align=right | 1.8 km || 
|-id=742 bgcolor=#E9E9E9
| 375742 ||  || — || September 15, 2009 || Kitt Peak || Spacewatch || — || align=right | 1.2 km || 
|-id=743 bgcolor=#E9E9E9
| 375743 ||  || — || September 16, 2009 || Mount Lemmon || Mount Lemmon Survey || — || align=right | 1.1 km || 
|-id=744 bgcolor=#E9E9E9
| 375744 ||  || — || September 16, 2009 || Kitt Peak || Spacewatch || — || align=right | 2.2 km || 
|-id=745 bgcolor=#E9E9E9
| 375745 ||  || — || September 16, 2009 || Kitt Peak || Spacewatch || JUN || align=right | 1.2 km || 
|-id=746 bgcolor=#E9E9E9
| 375746 ||  || — || September 16, 2009 || Kitt Peak || Spacewatch || — || align=right | 1.1 km || 
|-id=747 bgcolor=#E9E9E9
| 375747 ||  || — || September 16, 2009 || Kitt Peak || Spacewatch || — || align=right data-sort-value="0.89" | 890 m || 
|-id=748 bgcolor=#E9E9E9
| 375748 ||  || — || September 16, 2009 || Kitt Peak || Spacewatch || — || align=right | 1.4 km || 
|-id=749 bgcolor=#fefefe
| 375749 ||  || — || September 16, 2009 || Mount Lemmon || Mount Lemmon Survey || MAS || align=right data-sort-value="0.67" | 670 m || 
|-id=750 bgcolor=#E9E9E9
| 375750 ||  || — || September 16, 2009 || Kitt Peak || Spacewatch || — || align=right | 1.1 km || 
|-id=751 bgcolor=#E9E9E9
| 375751 ||  || — || September 16, 2009 || Kitt Peak || Spacewatch || — || align=right | 1.6 km || 
|-id=752 bgcolor=#fefefe
| 375752 ||  || — || September 17, 2009 || Mount Lemmon || Mount Lemmon Survey || V || align=right data-sort-value="0.79" | 790 m || 
|-id=753 bgcolor=#E9E9E9
| 375753 ||  || — || September 17, 2009 || Kitt Peak || Spacewatch || — || align=right | 2.5 km || 
|-id=754 bgcolor=#fefefe
| 375754 ||  || — || September 17, 2009 || Mount Lemmon || Mount Lemmon Survey || MAS || align=right data-sort-value="0.74" | 740 m || 
|-id=755 bgcolor=#E9E9E9
| 375755 ||  || — || September 17, 2009 || Kitt Peak || Spacewatch || — || align=right | 1.2 km || 
|-id=756 bgcolor=#E9E9E9
| 375756 ||  || — || May 30, 2008 || Mount Lemmon || Mount Lemmon Survey || GER || align=right | 1.8 km || 
|-id=757 bgcolor=#fefefe
| 375757 ||  || — || September 18, 2009 || Mount Lemmon || Mount Lemmon Survey || MAS || align=right data-sort-value="0.75" | 750 m || 
|-id=758 bgcolor=#E9E9E9
| 375758 ||  || — || September 19, 2009 || Mount Lemmon || Mount Lemmon Survey || — || align=right | 1.1 km || 
|-id=759 bgcolor=#E9E9E9
| 375759 ||  || — || September 20, 2009 || Moletai || K. Černis, J. Zdanavičius || BAR || align=right | 1.4 km || 
|-id=760 bgcolor=#E9E9E9
| 375760 ||  || — || September 17, 2009 || Catalina || CSS || — || align=right | 1.1 km || 
|-id=761 bgcolor=#fefefe
| 375761 ||  || — || September 18, 2009 || Kitt Peak || Spacewatch || — || align=right | 1.1 km || 
|-id=762 bgcolor=#fefefe
| 375762 ||  || — || September 18, 2009 || Kitt Peak || Spacewatch || — || align=right data-sort-value="0.82" | 820 m || 
|-id=763 bgcolor=#E9E9E9
| 375763 ||  || — || September 18, 2009 || Kitt Peak || Spacewatch || — || align=right | 2.1 km || 
|-id=764 bgcolor=#E9E9E9
| 375764 ||  || — || September 18, 2009 || Kitt Peak || Spacewatch || JUN || align=right | 1.2 km || 
|-id=765 bgcolor=#E9E9E9
| 375765 ||  || — || September 18, 2009 || Kitt Peak || Spacewatch || JUN || align=right | 1.0 km || 
|-id=766 bgcolor=#E9E9E9
| 375766 ||  || — || September 18, 2009 || Kitt Peak || Spacewatch || — || align=right | 1.3 km || 
|-id=767 bgcolor=#E9E9E9
| 375767 ||  || — || September 18, 2009 || Kitt Peak || Spacewatch || — || align=right | 1.2 km || 
|-id=768 bgcolor=#E9E9E9
| 375768 ||  || — || September 18, 2009 || Kitt Peak || Spacewatch || MAR || align=right | 1.1 km || 
|-id=769 bgcolor=#E9E9E9
| 375769 ||  || — || September 19, 2009 || Kitt Peak || Spacewatch || — || align=right | 1.3 km || 
|-id=770 bgcolor=#E9E9E9
| 375770 ||  || — || March 10, 2008 || Kitt Peak || Spacewatch || — || align=right data-sort-value="0.90" | 900 m || 
|-id=771 bgcolor=#fefefe
| 375771 ||  || — || August 1, 2005 || Campo Imperatore || CINEOS || V || align=right data-sort-value="0.68" | 680 m || 
|-id=772 bgcolor=#fefefe
| 375772 ||  || — || February 16, 2007 || Mount Lemmon || Mount Lemmon Survey || — || align=right data-sort-value="0.89" | 890 m || 
|-id=773 bgcolor=#E9E9E9
| 375773 ||  || — || September 20, 2009 || Kitt Peak || Spacewatch || — || align=right | 1.2 km || 
|-id=774 bgcolor=#E9E9E9
| 375774 ||  || — || September 20, 2009 || Kitt Peak || Spacewatch || EUN || align=right | 1.2 km || 
|-id=775 bgcolor=#E9E9E9
| 375775 ||  || — || September 20, 2009 || Kitt Peak || Spacewatch || — || align=right data-sort-value="0.77" | 770 m || 
|-id=776 bgcolor=#E9E9E9
| 375776 ||  || — || September 22, 2009 || Mount Lemmon || Mount Lemmon Survey || JUN || align=right | 1.3 km || 
|-id=777 bgcolor=#fefefe
| 375777 ||  || — || September 16, 2009 || Catalina || CSS || — || align=right | 1.3 km || 
|-id=778 bgcolor=#E9E9E9
| 375778 ||  || — || September 16, 2009 || Catalina || CSS || — || align=right | 2.7 km || 
|-id=779 bgcolor=#fefefe
| 375779 ||  || — || September 23, 2009 || Tiki || N. Teamo || — || align=right data-sort-value="0.89" | 890 m || 
|-id=780 bgcolor=#fefefe
| 375780 ||  || — || September 25, 2009 || Kitt Peak || Spacewatch || — || align=right data-sort-value="0.92" | 920 m || 
|-id=781 bgcolor=#E9E9E9
| 375781 ||  || — || September 25, 2009 || Mount Lemmon || Mount Lemmon Survey || — || align=right data-sort-value="0.71" | 710 m || 
|-id=782 bgcolor=#fefefe
| 375782 ||  || — || September 25, 2009 || Mount Lemmon || Mount Lemmon Survey || — || align=right | 1.1 km || 
|-id=783 bgcolor=#E9E9E9
| 375783 ||  || — || September 25, 2009 || Kitt Peak || Spacewatch || — || align=right | 2.2 km || 
|-id=784 bgcolor=#fefefe
| 375784 ||  || — || September 26, 2009 || Mount Lemmon || Mount Lemmon Survey || — || align=right | 1.1 km || 
|-id=785 bgcolor=#E9E9E9
| 375785 ||  || — || September 27, 2009 || Mount Lemmon || Mount Lemmon Survey || — || align=right | 1.1 km || 
|-id=786 bgcolor=#E9E9E9
| 375786 ||  || — || September 21, 2009 || Catalina || CSS || EUN || align=right | 1.5 km || 
|-id=787 bgcolor=#E9E9E9
| 375787 ||  || — || August 28, 2009 || Kitt Peak || Spacewatch || — || align=right data-sort-value="0.82" | 820 m || 
|-id=788 bgcolor=#E9E9E9
| 375788 ||  || — || September 18, 2009 || Kitt Peak || Spacewatch || — || align=right | 1.7 km || 
|-id=789 bgcolor=#fefefe
| 375789 ||  || — || September 26, 2009 || Kitt Peak || Spacewatch || — || align=right | 1.0 km || 
|-id=790 bgcolor=#E9E9E9
| 375790 ||  || — || September 28, 2009 || Kitt Peak || Spacewatch || BAR || align=right | 1.4 km || 
|-id=791 bgcolor=#E9E9E9
| 375791 ||  || — || September 21, 2009 || Catalina || CSS || JUN || align=right | 2.2 km || 
|-id=792 bgcolor=#E9E9E9
| 375792 ||  || — || September 22, 2009 || Mount Lemmon || Mount Lemmon Survey || DOR || align=right | 1.9 km || 
|-id=793 bgcolor=#E9E9E9
| 375793 ||  || — || September 22, 2009 || Mount Lemmon || Mount Lemmon Survey || — || align=right | 2.4 km || 
|-id=794 bgcolor=#E9E9E9
| 375794 ||  || — || September 22, 2009 || Kitt Peak || Spacewatch || — || align=right data-sort-value="0.88" | 880 m || 
|-id=795 bgcolor=#E9E9E9
| 375795 ||  || — || September 18, 2009 || Kitt Peak || Spacewatch || — || align=right | 1.2 km || 
|-id=796 bgcolor=#fefefe
| 375796 ||  || — || September 20, 2009 || Kitt Peak || Spacewatch || MAS || align=right data-sort-value="0.75" | 750 m || 
|-id=797 bgcolor=#fefefe
| 375797 ||  || — || September 23, 2009 || Mount Lemmon || Mount Lemmon Survey || — || align=right | 1.2 km || 
|-id=798 bgcolor=#E9E9E9
| 375798 Divini ||  ||  || October 12, 2009 || Vallemare di Borbona || V. S. Casulli || EUN || align=right | 1.0 km || 
|-id=799 bgcolor=#E9E9E9
| 375799 ||  || — || October 13, 2009 || Bergisch Gladbac || W. Bickel || — || align=right | 1.0 km || 
|-id=800 bgcolor=#fefefe
| 375800 ||  || — || September 16, 2009 || Mount Lemmon || Mount Lemmon Survey || — || align=right data-sort-value="0.83" | 830 m || 
|}

375801–375900 

|-bgcolor=#E9E9E9
| 375801 ||  || — || September 20, 2009 || Moletai || K. Černis, J. Zdanavičius || — || align=right | 1.4 km || 
|-id=802 bgcolor=#E9E9E9
| 375802 ||  || — || October 11, 2009 || Catalina || CSS || — || align=right | 1.1 km || 
|-id=803 bgcolor=#E9E9E9
| 375803 ||  || — || October 1, 2009 || Mount Lemmon || Mount Lemmon Survey || — || align=right | 1.4 km || 
|-id=804 bgcolor=#fefefe
| 375804 ||  || — || October 1, 2009 || Mount Lemmon || Mount Lemmon Survey || — || align=right | 3.7 km || 
|-id=805 bgcolor=#E9E9E9
| 375805 ||  || — || October 11, 2009 || Mount Lemmon || Mount Lemmon Survey || — || align=right data-sort-value="0.72" | 720 m || 
|-id=806 bgcolor=#fefefe
| 375806 ||  || — || October 12, 2009 || La Sagra || OAM Obs. || — || align=right | 1.3 km || 
|-id=807 bgcolor=#fefefe
| 375807 ||  || — || October 15, 2009 || La Sagra || OAM Obs. || — || align=right | 2.4 km || 
|-id=808 bgcolor=#fefefe
| 375808 ||  || — || October 15, 2009 || La Sagra || OAM Obs. || CIM || align=right | 2.4 km || 
|-id=809 bgcolor=#E9E9E9
| 375809 ||  || — || October 14, 2009 || Catalina || CSS || — || align=right | 1.6 km || 
|-id=810 bgcolor=#E9E9E9
| 375810 ||  || — || October 11, 2009 || Mount Lemmon || Mount Lemmon Survey || — || align=right | 1.1 km || 
|-id=811 bgcolor=#E9E9E9
| 375811 ||  || — || October 12, 2009 || Mount Lemmon || Mount Lemmon Survey || — || align=right | 1.5 km || 
|-id=812 bgcolor=#E9E9E9
| 375812 ||  || — || October 17, 2009 || Mayhill || A. Lowe || BRU || align=right | 4.1 km || 
|-id=813 bgcolor=#E9E9E9
| 375813 ||  || — || October 17, 2009 || Bisei SG Center || BATTeRS || — || align=right data-sort-value="0.96" | 960 m || 
|-id=814 bgcolor=#E9E9E9
| 375814 ||  || — || October 18, 2009 || Kitt Peak || Spacewatch || EUN || align=right | 1.2 km || 
|-id=815 bgcolor=#E9E9E9
| 375815 ||  || — || October 18, 2009 || Catalina || CSS || EUN || align=right | 1.5 km || 
|-id=816 bgcolor=#E9E9E9
| 375816 ||  || — || October 21, 2009 || Catalina || CSS || — || align=right | 1.9 km || 
|-id=817 bgcolor=#E9E9E9
| 375817 ||  || — || October 22, 2009 || Catalina || CSS || — || align=right | 1.8 km || 
|-id=818 bgcolor=#E9E9E9
| 375818 ||  || — || October 22, 2009 || Catalina || CSS || — || align=right | 1.4 km || 
|-id=819 bgcolor=#E9E9E9
| 375819 ||  || — || October 21, 2009 || Mount Lemmon || Mount Lemmon Survey || — || align=right | 1.5 km || 
|-id=820 bgcolor=#E9E9E9
| 375820 ||  || — || October 18, 2009 || Mount Lemmon || Mount Lemmon Survey || — || align=right | 2.6 km || 
|-id=821 bgcolor=#E9E9E9
| 375821 ||  || — || October 18, 2009 || Mount Lemmon || Mount Lemmon Survey || — || align=right | 2.2 km || 
|-id=822 bgcolor=#E9E9E9
| 375822 ||  || — || October 18, 2009 || Kitt Peak || Spacewatch || — || align=right | 1.8 km || 
|-id=823 bgcolor=#fefefe
| 375823 ||  || — || September 17, 2009 || Kitt Peak || Spacewatch || NYS || align=right data-sort-value="0.90" | 900 m || 
|-id=824 bgcolor=#fefefe
| 375824 ||  || — || October 18, 2009 || Mount Lemmon || Mount Lemmon Survey || V || align=right data-sort-value="0.95" | 950 m || 
|-id=825 bgcolor=#E9E9E9
| 375825 ||  || — || October 23, 2009 || Mount Lemmon || Mount Lemmon Survey || — || align=right | 1.7 km || 
|-id=826 bgcolor=#fefefe
| 375826 ||  || — || October 18, 2009 || Mount Lemmon || Mount Lemmon Survey || — || align=right | 1.0 km || 
|-id=827 bgcolor=#fefefe
| 375827 ||  || — || October 21, 2009 || Mount Lemmon || Mount Lemmon Survey || — || align=right | 2.8 km || 
|-id=828 bgcolor=#E9E9E9
| 375828 ||  || — || October 22, 2009 || Catalina || CSS || — || align=right | 1.7 km || 
|-id=829 bgcolor=#E9E9E9
| 375829 ||  || — || October 24, 2009 || Mount Lemmon || Mount Lemmon Survey || — || align=right data-sort-value="0.66" | 660 m || 
|-id=830 bgcolor=#E9E9E9
| 375830 ||  || — || October 24, 2009 || Catalina || CSS || — || align=right | 1.1 km || 
|-id=831 bgcolor=#E9E9E9
| 375831 ||  || — || October 15, 2009 || Socorro || LINEAR || MAR || align=right | 1.4 km || 
|-id=832 bgcolor=#E9E9E9
| 375832 Yurijmedvedev ||  ||  || October 22, 2009 || Zelenchukskaya || T. V. Kryachko || — || align=right | 1.7 km || 
|-id=833 bgcolor=#E9E9E9
| 375833 ||  || — || October 23, 2009 || Mount Lemmon || Mount Lemmon Survey || KON || align=right | 2.5 km || 
|-id=834 bgcolor=#E9E9E9
| 375834 ||  || — || October 23, 2009 || Kitt Peak || Spacewatch || EUN || align=right | 1.4 km || 
|-id=835 bgcolor=#E9E9E9
| 375835 ||  || — || October 26, 2009 || Catalina || CSS || — || align=right | 2.1 km || 
|-id=836 bgcolor=#E9E9E9
| 375836 ||  || — || October 22, 2009 || Mount Lemmon || Mount Lemmon Survey || — || align=right | 2.0 km || 
|-id=837 bgcolor=#E9E9E9
| 375837 ||  || — || October 18, 2009 || La Sagra || OAM Obs. || — || align=right | 2.5 km || 
|-id=838 bgcolor=#E9E9E9
| 375838 ||  || — || October 25, 2009 || Kitt Peak || Spacewatch || — || align=right | 1.3 km || 
|-id=839 bgcolor=#E9E9E9
| 375839 ||  || — || October 24, 2009 || Catalina || CSS || — || align=right | 2.9 km || 
|-id=840 bgcolor=#E9E9E9
| 375840 ||  || — || October 24, 2009 || Catalina || CSS || EUN || align=right | 1.4 km || 
|-id=841 bgcolor=#E9E9E9
| 375841 ||  || — || October 24, 2009 || Catalina || CSS || — || align=right | 2.6 km || 
|-id=842 bgcolor=#E9E9E9
| 375842 ||  || — || October 23, 2009 || Mount Lemmon || Mount Lemmon Survey || — || align=right | 1.0 km || 
|-id=843 bgcolor=#E9E9E9
| 375843 ||  || — || October 22, 2009 || Mount Lemmon || Mount Lemmon Survey || — || align=right | 1.3 km || 
|-id=844 bgcolor=#E9E9E9
| 375844 ||  || — || October 26, 2009 || Mount Lemmon || Mount Lemmon Survey || — || align=right | 2.1 km || 
|-id=845 bgcolor=#E9E9E9
| 375845 ||  || — || October 16, 2009 || Mount Lemmon || Mount Lemmon Survey || NEM || align=right | 2.2 km || 
|-id=846 bgcolor=#E9E9E9
| 375846 ||  || — || October 22, 2009 || Mount Lemmon || Mount Lemmon Survey || — || align=right | 1.4 km || 
|-id=847 bgcolor=#E9E9E9
| 375847 ||  || — || October 30, 2009 || Mount Lemmon || Mount Lemmon Survey || GEF || align=right | 1.3 km || 
|-id=848 bgcolor=#E9E9E9
| 375848 ||  || — || October 23, 2009 || Kitt Peak || Spacewatch || — || align=right | 1.9 km || 
|-id=849 bgcolor=#E9E9E9
| 375849 ||  || — || September 16, 2009 || Mount Lemmon || Mount Lemmon Survey || — || align=right | 1.7 km || 
|-id=850 bgcolor=#E9E9E9
| 375850 ||  || — || October 30, 2009 || Mount Lemmon || Mount Lemmon Survey || — || align=right | 1.1 km || 
|-id=851 bgcolor=#E9E9E9
| 375851 ||  || — || November 8, 2009 || Mount Lemmon || Mount Lemmon Survey || — || align=right | 1.3 km || 
|-id=852 bgcolor=#E9E9E9
| 375852 ||  || — || November 8, 2009 || Mount Lemmon || Mount Lemmon Survey || — || align=right | 1.6 km || 
|-id=853 bgcolor=#fefefe
| 375853 ||  || — || October 22, 2005 || Kitt Peak || Spacewatch || NYS || align=right data-sort-value="0.72" | 720 m || 
|-id=854 bgcolor=#E9E9E9
| 375854 ||  || — || November 8, 2009 || Mount Lemmon || Mount Lemmon Survey || — || align=right | 2.3 km || 
|-id=855 bgcolor=#E9E9E9
| 375855 ||  || — || November 8, 2009 || Mount Lemmon || Mount Lemmon Survey || — || align=right data-sort-value="0.97" | 970 m || 
|-id=856 bgcolor=#E9E9E9
| 375856 ||  || — || November 8, 2009 || Mount Lemmon || Mount Lemmon Survey || — || align=right | 1.9 km || 
|-id=857 bgcolor=#E9E9E9
| 375857 ||  || — || November 8, 2009 || Catalina || CSS || — || align=right | 1.2 km || 
|-id=858 bgcolor=#E9E9E9
| 375858 ||  || — || November 9, 2009 || Kitt Peak || Spacewatch || — || align=right | 1.5 km || 
|-id=859 bgcolor=#E9E9E9
| 375859 ||  || — || November 9, 2009 || Mount Lemmon || Mount Lemmon Survey || EUN || align=right | 1.4 km || 
|-id=860 bgcolor=#E9E9E9
| 375860 ||  || — || September 21, 2009 || Mount Lemmon || Mount Lemmon Survey || — || align=right | 1.6 km || 
|-id=861 bgcolor=#E9E9E9
| 375861 ||  || — || November 8, 2009 || Kitt Peak || Spacewatch || — || align=right | 1.9 km || 
|-id=862 bgcolor=#E9E9E9
| 375862 ||  || — || November 9, 2009 || Mount Lemmon || Mount Lemmon Survey || — || align=right | 2.3 km || 
|-id=863 bgcolor=#E9E9E9
| 375863 ||  || — || March 9, 2007 || Kitt Peak || Spacewatch || — || align=right | 2.7 km || 
|-id=864 bgcolor=#E9E9E9
| 375864 ||  || — || November 10, 2009 || Mount Lemmon || Mount Lemmon Survey || — || align=right | 1.8 km || 
|-id=865 bgcolor=#E9E9E9
| 375865 ||  || — || September 21, 2009 || Mount Lemmon || Mount Lemmon Survey || — || align=right | 1.5 km || 
|-id=866 bgcolor=#E9E9E9
| 375866 ||  || — || November 9, 2009 || Kitt Peak || Spacewatch || — || align=right | 1.2 km || 
|-id=867 bgcolor=#E9E9E9
| 375867 ||  || — || November 11, 2009 || Kitt Peak || Spacewatch || — || align=right | 1.3 km || 
|-id=868 bgcolor=#E9E9E9
| 375868 ||  || — || November 11, 2009 || Kitt Peak || Spacewatch || MAR || align=right | 1.3 km || 
|-id=869 bgcolor=#E9E9E9
| 375869 ||  || — || November 9, 2009 || Mount Lemmon || Mount Lemmon Survey || — || align=right | 1.5 km || 
|-id=870 bgcolor=#E9E9E9
| 375870 ||  || — || November 11, 2009 || Kitt Peak || Spacewatch || — || align=right | 1.9 km || 
|-id=871 bgcolor=#E9E9E9
| 375871 ||  || — || January 14, 2002 || Kitt Peak || Spacewatch || HEN || align=right | 1.2 km || 
|-id=872 bgcolor=#E9E9E9
| 375872 ||  || — || November 9, 2009 || Catalina || CSS || — || align=right | 1.4 km || 
|-id=873 bgcolor=#E9E9E9
| 375873 ||  || — || November 8, 2009 || Kitt Peak || Spacewatch || — || align=right | 2.1 km || 
|-id=874 bgcolor=#E9E9E9
| 375874 ||  || — || October 22, 2009 || Mount Lemmon || Mount Lemmon Survey || — || align=right | 3.1 km || 
|-id=875 bgcolor=#E9E9E9
| 375875 ||  || — || October 26, 2009 || Kitt Peak || Spacewatch || — || align=right | 1.3 km || 
|-id=876 bgcolor=#d6d6d6
| 375876 ||  || — || November 11, 2009 || Mount Lemmon || Mount Lemmon Survey || TIR || align=right | 3.3 km || 
|-id=877 bgcolor=#E9E9E9
| 375877 ||  || — || November 12, 2009 || La Sagra || OAM Obs. || — || align=right | 2.5 km || 
|-id=878 bgcolor=#E9E9E9
| 375878 ||  || — || November 15, 2009 || Catalina || CSS || — || align=right | 2.4 km || 
|-id=879 bgcolor=#E9E9E9
| 375879 ||  || — || November 12, 2009 || Dauban || F. Kugel || — || align=right | 2.3 km || 
|-id=880 bgcolor=#E9E9E9
| 375880 ||  || — || October 14, 2009 || Catalina || CSS || — || align=right | 3.1 km || 
|-id=881 bgcolor=#E9E9E9
| 375881 ||  || — || November 8, 2009 || Kitt Peak || Spacewatch || — || align=right | 1.3 km || 
|-id=882 bgcolor=#E9E9E9
| 375882 ||  || — || November 8, 2009 || Kitt Peak || Spacewatch || — || align=right | 1.5 km || 
|-id=883 bgcolor=#E9E9E9
| 375883 ||  || — || November 8, 2009 || Kitt Peak || Spacewatch || — || align=right | 1.9 km || 
|-id=884 bgcolor=#E9E9E9
| 375884 ||  || — || November 8, 2009 || Kitt Peak || Spacewatch || — || align=right | 2.7 km || 
|-id=885 bgcolor=#E9E9E9
| 375885 ||  || — || November 8, 2009 || Kitt Peak || Spacewatch || — || align=right | 2.7 km || 
|-id=886 bgcolor=#E9E9E9
| 375886 ||  || — || November 10, 2009 || Kitt Peak || Spacewatch || — || align=right | 1.4 km || 
|-id=887 bgcolor=#E9E9E9
| 375887 ||  || — || November 11, 2009 || Kitt Peak || Spacewatch || — || align=right data-sort-value="0.99" | 990 m || 
|-id=888 bgcolor=#E9E9E9
| 375888 ||  || — || November 14, 2009 || Socorro || LINEAR || — || align=right data-sort-value="0.99" | 990 m || 
|-id=889 bgcolor=#E9E9E9
| 375889 ||  || — || November 14, 2009 || Socorro || LINEAR || — || align=right | 1.1 km || 
|-id=890 bgcolor=#E9E9E9
| 375890 ||  || — || November 14, 2009 || Socorro || LINEAR || — || align=right | 1.7 km || 
|-id=891 bgcolor=#E9E9E9
| 375891 ||  || — || November 15, 2009 || Catalina || CSS || — || align=right | 1.1 km || 
|-id=892 bgcolor=#E9E9E9
| 375892 ||  || — || November 8, 2009 || Kitt Peak || Spacewatch || — || align=right | 2.2 km || 
|-id=893 bgcolor=#E9E9E9
| 375893 ||  || — || August 22, 2004 || Kitt Peak || Spacewatch || — || align=right | 1.9 km || 
|-id=894 bgcolor=#E9E9E9
| 375894 ||  || — || November 25, 2005 || Kitt Peak || Spacewatch || — || align=right | 1.0 km || 
|-id=895 bgcolor=#E9E9E9
| 375895 ||  || — || November 10, 2009 || Kitt Peak || Spacewatch || — || align=right | 1.1 km || 
|-id=896 bgcolor=#E9E9E9
| 375896 ||  || — || November 10, 2009 || Kitt Peak || Spacewatch || HOF || align=right | 3.5 km || 
|-id=897 bgcolor=#E9E9E9
| 375897 ||  || — || November 10, 2009 || Kitt Peak || Spacewatch || AGN || align=right | 1.2 km || 
|-id=898 bgcolor=#E9E9E9
| 375898 ||  || — || September 28, 2009 || Mount Lemmon || Mount Lemmon Survey || — || align=right | 2.9 km || 
|-id=899 bgcolor=#E9E9E9
| 375899 ||  || — || October 25, 2009 || Kitt Peak || Spacewatch || — || align=right | 1.7 km || 
|-id=900 bgcolor=#d6d6d6
| 375900 ||  || — || November 9, 2009 || Kitt Peak || Spacewatch || — || align=right | 2.6 km || 
|}

375901–376000 

|-bgcolor=#E9E9E9
| 375901 ||  || — || November 9, 2009 || Kitt Peak || Spacewatch || — || align=right | 2.2 km || 
|-id=902 bgcolor=#E9E9E9
| 375902 ||  || — || November 9, 2009 || Kitt Peak || Spacewatch || — || align=right | 1.6 km || 
|-id=903 bgcolor=#E9E9E9
| 375903 ||  || — || November 8, 2009 || Kitt Peak || Spacewatch || — || align=right | 1.0 km || 
|-id=904 bgcolor=#E9E9E9
| 375904 ||  || — || November 10, 2009 || Catalina || CSS || slow || align=right | 1.5 km || 
|-id=905 bgcolor=#E9E9E9
| 375905 ||  || — || November 8, 2009 || Mount Lemmon || Mount Lemmon Survey || MAR || align=right | 1.4 km || 
|-id=906 bgcolor=#E9E9E9
| 375906 ||  || — || November 10, 2009 || Mount Lemmon || Mount Lemmon Survey || — || align=right | 1.2 km || 
|-id=907 bgcolor=#E9E9E9
| 375907 ||  || — || November 8, 2009 || Kitt Peak || Spacewatch || — || align=right | 1.3 km || 
|-id=908 bgcolor=#d6d6d6
| 375908 ||  || — || November 8, 2009 || Mount Lemmon || Mount Lemmon Survey || KOR || align=right | 1.3 km || 
|-id=909 bgcolor=#E9E9E9
| 375909 ||  || — || November 9, 2009 || Kitt Peak || Spacewatch || — || align=right | 2.1 km || 
|-id=910 bgcolor=#E9E9E9
| 375910 ||  || — || November 19, 2009 || Socorro || LINEAR || — || align=right | 2.1 km || 
|-id=911 bgcolor=#E9E9E9
| 375911 ||  || — || November 19, 2009 || Socorro || LINEAR || EUN || align=right | 1.6 km || 
|-id=912 bgcolor=#E9E9E9
| 375912 ||  || — || November 16, 2009 || Mount Lemmon || Mount Lemmon Survey || AGN || align=right | 1.1 km || 
|-id=913 bgcolor=#E9E9E9
| 375913 ||  || — || September 10, 2004 || Kitt Peak || Spacewatch || NEM || align=right | 1.9 km || 
|-id=914 bgcolor=#E9E9E9
| 375914 ||  || — || November 19, 2009 || Catalina || CSS || EUN || align=right | 1.7 km || 
|-id=915 bgcolor=#E9E9E9
| 375915 ||  || — || April 13, 2007 || Siding Spring || SSS || — || align=right | 2.4 km || 
|-id=916 bgcolor=#E9E9E9
| 375916 ||  || — || November 16, 2009 || Kitt Peak || Spacewatch || MRX || align=right | 1.1 km || 
|-id=917 bgcolor=#E9E9E9
| 375917 ||  || — || November 16, 2009 || Kitt Peak || Spacewatch || — || align=right | 1.5 km || 
|-id=918 bgcolor=#E9E9E9
| 375918 ||  || — || November 17, 2009 || Kitt Peak || Spacewatch || EUN || align=right | 1.2 km || 
|-id=919 bgcolor=#E9E9E9
| 375919 ||  || — || November 17, 2009 || Kitt Peak || Spacewatch || — || align=right | 1.9 km || 
|-id=920 bgcolor=#E9E9E9
| 375920 ||  || — || November 17, 2009 || Kitt Peak || Spacewatch || — || align=right | 2.0 km || 
|-id=921 bgcolor=#E9E9E9
| 375921 ||  || — || December 2, 2004 || Kitt Peak || Spacewatch || — || align=right | 2.3 km || 
|-id=922 bgcolor=#d6d6d6
| 375922 ||  || — || November 17, 2009 || Kitt Peak || Spacewatch || KAR || align=right | 1.3 km || 
|-id=923 bgcolor=#E9E9E9
| 375923 ||  || — || November 17, 2009 || Catalina || CSS || EUN || align=right | 1.4 km || 
|-id=924 bgcolor=#E9E9E9
| 375924 ||  || — || December 5, 2005 || Kitt Peak || Spacewatch || — || align=right | 1.6 km || 
|-id=925 bgcolor=#E9E9E9
| 375925 ||  || — || November 18, 2009 || Mount Lemmon || Mount Lemmon Survey || — || align=right | 1.2 km || 
|-id=926 bgcolor=#E9E9E9
| 375926 ||  || — || November 18, 2009 || Mount Lemmon || Mount Lemmon Survey || ADE || align=right | 2.1 km || 
|-id=927 bgcolor=#E9E9E9
| 375927 Ibara ||  ||  || November 22, 2009 || Bisei SG Center || BATTeRS || — || align=right | 3.6 km || 
|-id=928 bgcolor=#E9E9E9
| 375928 ||  || — || November 16, 2009 || Mount Lemmon || Mount Lemmon Survey || NEM || align=right | 2.3 km || 
|-id=929 bgcolor=#E9E9E9
| 375929 ||  || — || November 17, 2009 || Kitt Peak || Spacewatch || — || align=right | 1.7 km || 
|-id=930 bgcolor=#E9E9E9
| 375930 ||  || — || November 17, 2009 || Mount Lemmon || Mount Lemmon Survey || — || align=right | 1.7 km || 
|-id=931 bgcolor=#E9E9E9
| 375931 ||  || — || May 5, 2003 || Kitt Peak || Spacewatch || — || align=right | 1.9 km || 
|-id=932 bgcolor=#E9E9E9
| 375932 ||  || — || November 18, 2009 || Kitt Peak || Spacewatch || — || align=right | 2.0 km || 
|-id=933 bgcolor=#E9E9E9
| 375933 ||  || — || November 18, 2009 || Kitt Peak || Spacewatch || HEN || align=right | 1.2 km || 
|-id=934 bgcolor=#E9E9E9
| 375934 ||  || — || December 28, 2005 || Mount Lemmon || Mount Lemmon Survey || PAD || align=right | 1.5 km || 
|-id=935 bgcolor=#E9E9E9
| 375935 ||  || — || November 19, 2009 || Kitt Peak || Spacewatch || — || align=right | 1.1 km || 
|-id=936 bgcolor=#E9E9E9
| 375936 ||  || — || November 19, 2009 || Kitt Peak || Spacewatch || — || align=right | 1.2 km || 
|-id=937 bgcolor=#E9E9E9
| 375937 ||  || — || November 19, 2009 || Kitt Peak || Spacewatch || — || align=right | 1.7 km || 
|-id=938 bgcolor=#E9E9E9
| 375938 ||  || — || November 19, 2009 || Kitt Peak || Spacewatch || — || align=right | 1.3 km || 
|-id=939 bgcolor=#E9E9E9
| 375939 ||  || — || November 19, 2009 || Kitt Peak || Spacewatch || — || align=right | 1.2 km || 
|-id=940 bgcolor=#E9E9E9
| 375940 ||  || — || November 22, 2009 || Kitt Peak || Spacewatch || — || align=right | 2.9 km || 
|-id=941 bgcolor=#E9E9E9
| 375941 ||  || — || November 22, 2009 || Mount Lemmon || Mount Lemmon Survey || — || align=right | 1.6 km || 
|-id=942 bgcolor=#E9E9E9
| 375942 ||  || — || November 10, 2009 || Catalina || CSS || EUN || align=right | 1.6 km || 
|-id=943 bgcolor=#E9E9E9
| 375943 ||  || — || December 26, 2005 || Mount Lemmon || Mount Lemmon Survey || — || align=right | 1.2 km || 
|-id=944 bgcolor=#E9E9E9
| 375944 ||  || — || November 20, 2009 || Kitt Peak || Spacewatch || EUN || align=right | 1.9 km || 
|-id=945 bgcolor=#E9E9E9
| 375945 ||  || — || April 15, 2007 || Kitt Peak || Spacewatch || — || align=right | 2.4 km || 
|-id=946 bgcolor=#E9E9E9
| 375946 ||  || — || September 22, 2009 || Mount Lemmon || Mount Lemmon Survey || WIT || align=right | 1.1 km || 
|-id=947 bgcolor=#E9E9E9
| 375947 ||  || — || October 24, 2009 || Catalina || CSS || — || align=right | 2.9 km || 
|-id=948 bgcolor=#E9E9E9
| 375948 ||  || — || November 19, 2009 || Mount Lemmon || Mount Lemmon Survey || ADE || align=right | 2.8 km || 
|-id=949 bgcolor=#E9E9E9
| 375949 ||  || — || November 17, 2009 || Kitt Peak || Spacewatch || HOF || align=right | 2.7 km || 
|-id=950 bgcolor=#E9E9E9
| 375950 ||  || — || November 21, 2009 || Kitt Peak || Spacewatch || KRM || align=right | 3.1 km || 
|-id=951 bgcolor=#E9E9E9
| 375951 ||  || — || November 21, 2009 || Kitt Peak || Spacewatch || HOF || align=right | 3.4 km || 
|-id=952 bgcolor=#E9E9E9
| 375952 ||  || — || November 22, 2009 || Kitt Peak || Spacewatch || — || align=right | 1.0 km || 
|-id=953 bgcolor=#E9E9E9
| 375953 ||  || — || November 22, 2009 || Kitt Peak || Spacewatch || — || align=right | 1.1 km || 
|-id=954 bgcolor=#E9E9E9
| 375954 ||  || — || November 22, 2009 || Kitt Peak || Spacewatch || — || align=right | 2.0 km || 
|-id=955 bgcolor=#E9E9E9
| 375955 ||  || — || November 22, 2009 || Catalina || CSS || — || align=right | 2.5 km || 
|-id=956 bgcolor=#E9E9E9
| 375956 ||  || — || March 13, 2007 || Mount Lemmon || Mount Lemmon Survey || — || align=right | 2.1 km || 
|-id=957 bgcolor=#E9E9E9
| 375957 ||  || — || March 16, 2007 || Kitt Peak || Spacewatch || — || align=right | 1.3 km || 
|-id=958 bgcolor=#E9E9E9
| 375958 ||  || — || November 23, 2009 || Kitt Peak || Spacewatch || WIT || align=right | 1.2 km || 
|-id=959 bgcolor=#E9E9E9
| 375959 ||  || — || November 23, 2009 || Kitt Peak || Spacewatch || CLO || align=right | 3.3 km || 
|-id=960 bgcolor=#E9E9E9
| 375960 ||  || — || November 25, 2009 || Kitt Peak || Spacewatch || — || align=right | 1.7 km || 
|-id=961 bgcolor=#E9E9E9
| 375961 ||  || — || November 25, 2009 || Catalina || CSS || CLO || align=right | 3.2 km || 
|-id=962 bgcolor=#E9E9E9
| 375962 ||  || — || November 26, 2009 || Mount Lemmon || Mount Lemmon Survey || — || align=right | 1.5 km || 
|-id=963 bgcolor=#E9E9E9
| 375963 ||  || — || November 16, 2009 || Kitt Peak || Spacewatch || — || align=right | 2.4 km || 
|-id=964 bgcolor=#E9E9E9
| 375964 ||  || — || April 22, 2007 || Mount Lemmon || Mount Lemmon Survey || — || align=right | 2.7 km || 
|-id=965 bgcolor=#E9E9E9
| 375965 ||  || — || September 24, 1992 || Kitt Peak || Spacewatch || — || align=right data-sort-value="0.95" | 950 m || 
|-id=966 bgcolor=#E9E9E9
| 375966 ||  || — || November 17, 2009 || Kitt Peak || Spacewatch || HOF || align=right | 2.8 km || 
|-id=967 bgcolor=#E9E9E9
| 375967 ||  || — || November 17, 2009 || Kitt Peak || Spacewatch || — || align=right | 1.1 km || 
|-id=968 bgcolor=#E9E9E9
| 375968 ||  || — || November 18, 2009 || Kitt Peak || Spacewatch || — || align=right | 2.1 km || 
|-id=969 bgcolor=#d6d6d6
| 375969 ||  || — || November 18, 2009 || Kitt Peak || Spacewatch || CHA || align=right | 2.2 km || 
|-id=970 bgcolor=#E9E9E9
| 375970 ||  || — || November 22, 2009 || Catalina || CSS || — || align=right | 1.3 km || 
|-id=971 bgcolor=#E9E9E9
| 375971 ||  || — || November 17, 2009 || Kitt Peak || Spacewatch || — || align=right | 1.0 km || 
|-id=972 bgcolor=#E9E9E9
| 375972 ||  || — || November 17, 2009 || Kitt Peak || Spacewatch || — || align=right | 1.9 km || 
|-id=973 bgcolor=#E9E9E9
| 375973 ||  || — || October 23, 2009 || Kitt Peak || Spacewatch || — || align=right | 1.4 km || 
|-id=974 bgcolor=#E9E9E9
| 375974 ||  || — || October 10, 2004 || Kitt Peak || Spacewatch || — || align=right | 1.7 km || 
|-id=975 bgcolor=#E9E9E9
| 375975 ||  || — || December 26, 2005 || Mount Lemmon || Mount Lemmon Survey || — || align=right | 1.4 km || 
|-id=976 bgcolor=#E9E9E9
| 375976 ||  || — || November 17, 2009 || Catalina || CSS || RAF || align=right | 1.1 km || 
|-id=977 bgcolor=#E9E9E9
| 375977 ||  || — || November 18, 2009 || Mount Lemmon || Mount Lemmon Survey || — || align=right | 1.0 km || 
|-id=978 bgcolor=#E9E9E9
| 375978 ||  || — || November 10, 2009 || Kitt Peak || Spacewatch || — || align=right | 1.2 km || 
|-id=979 bgcolor=#E9E9E9
| 375979 ||  || — || November 17, 2009 || Mount Lemmon || Mount Lemmon Survey || — || align=right | 1.4 km || 
|-id=980 bgcolor=#E9E9E9
| 375980 ||  || — || November 23, 2009 || Kitt Peak || Spacewatch || — || align=right | 1.1 km || 
|-id=981 bgcolor=#E9E9E9
| 375981 ||  || — || November 23, 2009 || Kitt Peak || Spacewatch || — || align=right | 2.4 km || 
|-id=982 bgcolor=#E9E9E9
| 375982 ||  || — || November 3, 2005 || Mount Lemmon || Mount Lemmon Survey || — || align=right | 1.0 km || 
|-id=983 bgcolor=#E9E9E9
| 375983 ||  || — || September 8, 2000 || Kitt Peak || Spacewatch || — || align=right | 1.7 km || 
|-id=984 bgcolor=#E9E9E9
| 375984 ||  || — || November 24, 2009 || Kitt Peak || Spacewatch || AGN || align=right | 1.4 km || 
|-id=985 bgcolor=#E9E9E9
| 375985 ||  || — || April 26, 2003 || Kitt Peak || Spacewatch || — || align=right | 1.7 km || 
|-id=986 bgcolor=#E9E9E9
| 375986 ||  || — || November 25, 2009 || Kitt Peak || Spacewatch || WIT || align=right | 1.1 km || 
|-id=987 bgcolor=#E9E9E9
| 375987 ||  || — || November 24, 2009 || Kitt Peak || Spacewatch || NEM || align=right | 2.7 km || 
|-id=988 bgcolor=#d6d6d6
| 375988 ||  || — || November 21, 2009 || Mount Lemmon || Mount Lemmon Survey || CHA || align=right | 2.5 km || 
|-id=989 bgcolor=#E9E9E9
| 375989 ||  || — || November 28, 2000 || Kitt Peak || Spacewatch || MRX || align=right | 1.2 km || 
|-id=990 bgcolor=#d6d6d6
| 375990 ||  || — || December 12, 2009 || Mayhill || A. Lowe || — || align=right | 2.9 km || 
|-id=991 bgcolor=#fefefe
| 375991 ||  || — || January 31, 2006 || Mount Lemmon || Mount Lemmon Survey || — || align=right | 1.7 km || 
|-id=992 bgcolor=#E9E9E9
| 375992 ||  || — || December 12, 2009 || Socorro || LINEAR || ADE || align=right | 3.0 km || 
|-id=993 bgcolor=#E9E9E9
| 375993 ||  || — || December 15, 2009 || Mount Lemmon || Mount Lemmon Survey || MRX || align=right | 1.4 km || 
|-id=994 bgcolor=#E9E9E9
| 375994 ||  || — || December 15, 2009 || Dauban || F. Kugel || — || align=right | 1.5 km || 
|-id=995 bgcolor=#E9E9E9
| 375995 ||  || — || December 10, 2009 || Socorro || LINEAR || — || align=right | 3.7 km || 
|-id=996 bgcolor=#E9E9E9
| 375996 ||  || — || December 17, 2009 || Mount Lemmon || Mount Lemmon Survey || — || align=right | 3.2 km || 
|-id=997 bgcolor=#E9E9E9
| 375997 ||  || — || December 17, 2009 || Mount Lemmon || Mount Lemmon Survey || — || align=right | 2.2 km || 
|-id=998 bgcolor=#E9E9E9
| 375998 ||  || — || December 18, 2009 || Mount Lemmon || Mount Lemmon Survey || HOF || align=right | 2.6 km || 
|-id=999 bgcolor=#d6d6d6
| 375999 ||  || — || December 17, 2009 || Kitt Peak || Spacewatch || — || align=right | 3.0 km || 
|-id=000 bgcolor=#E9E9E9
| 376000 ||  || — || January 4, 2010 || Kitt Peak || Spacewatch || — || align=right | 3.1 km || 
|}

References

External links 
 Discovery Circumstances: Numbered Minor Planets (375001)–(380000) (IAU Minor Planet Center)

0375